

282001–282100 

|-bgcolor=#d6d6d6
| 282001 ||  || — || May 4, 2006 || Mount Lemmon || Mount Lemmon Survey || — || align=right | 4.8 km || 
|-id=002 bgcolor=#d6d6d6
| 282002 ||  || — || March 17, 2005 || Kitt Peak || Spacewatch || — || align=right | 3.7 km || 
|-id=003 bgcolor=#d6d6d6
| 282003 ||  || — || March 16, 2005 || Catalina || CSS || — || align=right | 4.2 km || 
|-id=004 bgcolor=#E9E9E9
| 282004 ||  || — || April 9, 2003 || Kitt Peak || Spacewatch || — || align=right data-sort-value="0.91" | 910 m || 
|-id=005 bgcolor=#E9E9E9
| 282005 ||  || — || February 7, 2002 || Palomar || NEAT || ADE || align=right | 4.1 km || 
|-id=006 bgcolor=#E9E9E9
| 282006 ||  || — || November 1, 1999 || Kitt Peak || Spacewatch || HOF || align=right | 3.3 km || 
|-id=007 bgcolor=#d6d6d6
| 282007 ||  || — || November 8, 2008 || Mount Lemmon || Mount Lemmon Survey || — || align=right | 3.4 km || 
|-id=008 bgcolor=#E9E9E9
| 282008 ||  || — || May 5, 2002 || Palomar || NEAT || EUN || align=right | 2.1 km || 
|-id=009 bgcolor=#E9E9E9
| 282009 ||  || — || July 24, 2003 || Palomar || NEAT || — || align=right | 2.9 km || 
|-id=010 bgcolor=#E9E9E9
| 282010 ||  || — || January 22, 2006 || Catalina || CSS || — || align=right | 4.7 km || 
|-id=011 bgcolor=#d6d6d6
| 282011 ||  || — || February 12, 2000 || Apache Point || SDSS || THM || align=right | 2.5 km || 
|-id=012 bgcolor=#d6d6d6
| 282012 ||  || — || October 9, 2002 || Kitt Peak || Spacewatch || VER || align=right | 3.4 km || 
|-id=013 bgcolor=#d6d6d6
| 282013 ||  || — || January 18, 2004 || Kitt Peak || Spacewatch || — || align=right | 4.2 km || 
|-id=014 bgcolor=#E9E9E9
| 282014 ||  || — || May 25, 2003 || Kitt Peak || Spacewatch || — || align=right | 1.4 km || 
|-id=015 bgcolor=#E9E9E9
| 282015 ||  || — || December 2, 2004 || Catalina || CSS || GEF || align=right | 1.7 km || 
|-id=016 bgcolor=#E9E9E9
| 282016 ||  || — || April 25, 2007 || Mount Lemmon || Mount Lemmon Survey || — || align=right | 1.4 km || 
|-id=017 bgcolor=#d6d6d6
| 282017 ||  || — || October 23, 2003 || Kitt Peak || Spacewatch || — || align=right | 4.1 km || 
|-id=018 bgcolor=#fefefe
| 282018 ||  || — || March 7, 2003 || Needville || J. Dellinger, W. G. Dillon || MAS || align=right data-sort-value="0.89" | 890 m || 
|-id=019 bgcolor=#E9E9E9
| 282019 ||  || — || April 10, 2002 || Palomar || NEAT || MAR || align=right | 1.5 km || 
|-id=020 bgcolor=#E9E9E9
| 282020 ||  || — || October 22, 2003 || Apache Point || SDSS || EUN || align=right | 1.7 km || 
|-id=021 bgcolor=#d6d6d6
| 282021 ||  || — || August 11, 2001 || Palomar || NEAT || — || align=right | 3.7 km || 
|-id=022 bgcolor=#d6d6d6
| 282022 ||  || — || April 25, 2006 || Kitt Peak || Spacewatch || — || align=right | 4.1 km || 
|-id=023 bgcolor=#E9E9E9
| 282023 ||  || — || January 22, 2006 || Catalina || CSS || — || align=right | 1.6 km || 
|-id=024 bgcolor=#fefefe
| 282024 || 2852 P-L || — || September 24, 1960 || Palomar || PLS || MAS || align=right data-sort-value="0.81" | 810 m || 
|-id=025 bgcolor=#E9E9E9
| 282025 || 5347 T-2 || — || September 30, 1973 || Palomar || PLS || — || align=right | 1.9 km || 
|-id=026 bgcolor=#fefefe
| 282026 || 2184 T-3 || — || October 16, 1977 || Palomar || PLS || — || align=right | 1.1 km || 
|-id=027 bgcolor=#fefefe
| 282027 || 5069 T-3 || — || October 16, 1977 || Palomar || PLS || — || align=right | 1.2 km || 
|-id=028 bgcolor=#fefefe
| 282028 ||  || — || October 10, 1990 || Tautenburg Observatory || F. Börngen, L. D. Schmadel || ERI || align=right | 1.6 km || 
|-id=029 bgcolor=#fefefe
| 282029 ||  || — || July 20, 1993 || La Silla || E. W. Elst || V || align=right | 1.0 km || 
|-id=030 bgcolor=#E9E9E9
| 282030 ||  || — || December 1, 1994 || Kitt Peak || Spacewatch || — || align=right | 1.8 km || 
|-id=031 bgcolor=#d6d6d6
| 282031 ||  || — || June 24, 1995 || Kitt Peak || Spacewatch || — || align=right | 3.0 km || 
|-id=032 bgcolor=#d6d6d6
| 282032 ||  || — || July 22, 1995 || Kitt Peak || Spacewatch || — || align=right | 3.6 km || 
|-id=033 bgcolor=#fefefe
| 282033 ||  || — || July 27, 1995 || Kitt Peak || Spacewatch || — || align=right data-sort-value="0.66" | 660 m || 
|-id=034 bgcolor=#E9E9E9
| 282034 || 1995 UO || — || October 19, 1995 || Sormano || V. Giuliani, A. Testa || EUN || align=right | 2.0 km || 
|-id=035 bgcolor=#E9E9E9
| 282035 ||  || — || November 17, 1995 || Kitt Peak || Spacewatch || — || align=right | 1.7 km || 
|-id=036 bgcolor=#fefefe
| 282036 ||  || — || March 18, 1996 || Kitt Peak || Spacewatch || V || align=right data-sort-value="0.61" | 610 m || 
|-id=037 bgcolor=#E9E9E9
| 282037 ||  || — || August 17, 1998 || Socorro || LINEAR || — || align=right | 2.4 km || 
|-id=038 bgcolor=#E9E9E9
| 282038 ||  || — || August 24, 1998 || Socorro || LINEAR || — || align=right | 1.7 km || 
|-id=039 bgcolor=#E9E9E9
| 282039 ||  || — || August 24, 1998 || Socorro || LINEAR || JUN || align=right | 1.6 km || 
|-id=040 bgcolor=#E9E9E9
| 282040 ||  || — || August 17, 1998 || Socorro || LINEAR || EUN || align=right | 2.2 km || 
|-id=041 bgcolor=#E9E9E9
| 282041 ||  || — || September 14, 1998 || Socorro || LINEAR || JUN || align=right | 1.5 km || 
|-id=042 bgcolor=#FA8072
| 282042 ||  || — || September 18, 1998 || Socorro || LINEAR || — || align=right | 2.1 km || 
|-id=043 bgcolor=#fefefe
| 282043 ||  || — || September 26, 1998 || Socorro || LINEAR || FLO || align=right data-sort-value="0.89" | 890 m || 
|-id=044 bgcolor=#FA8072
| 282044 ||  || — || September 26, 1998 || Socorro || LINEAR || — || align=right | 2.2 km || 
|-id=045 bgcolor=#d6d6d6
| 282045 ||  || — || November 10, 1998 || Caussols || ODAS || — || align=right | 4.5 km || 
|-id=046 bgcolor=#E9E9E9
| 282046 ||  || — || December 14, 1998 || Socorro || LINEAR || — || align=right | 3.5 km || 
|-id=047 bgcolor=#E9E9E9
| 282047 ||  || — || March 18, 1999 || Kitt Peak || Spacewatch || — || align=right | 2.3 km || 
|-id=048 bgcolor=#fefefe
| 282048 ||  || — || May 13, 1999 || Socorro || LINEAR || — || align=right | 2.9 km || 
|-id=049 bgcolor=#E9E9E9
| 282049 ||  || — || September 7, 1999 || Socorro || LINEAR || — || align=right | 1.3 km || 
|-id=050 bgcolor=#E9E9E9
| 282050 ||  || — || September 7, 1999 || Socorro || LINEAR || — || align=right | 1.0 km || 
|-id=051 bgcolor=#E9E9E9
| 282051 ||  || — || September 11, 1999 || Anderson Mesa || LONEOS || — || align=right | 1.4 km || 
|-id=052 bgcolor=#FA8072
| 282052 ||  || — || September 22, 1999 || Socorro || LINEAR || — || align=right | 3.5 km || 
|-id=053 bgcolor=#d6d6d6
| 282053 ||  || — || October 14, 1999 || Xinglong || SCAP || — || align=right | 4.2 km || 
|-id=054 bgcolor=#E9E9E9
| 282054 ||  || — || October 6, 1999 || Socorro || LINEAR || — || align=right | 1.5 km || 
|-id=055 bgcolor=#fefefe
| 282055 ||  || — || October 7, 1999 || Socorro || LINEAR || NYS || align=right data-sort-value="0.80" | 800 m || 
|-id=056 bgcolor=#E9E9E9
| 282056 ||  || — || October 10, 1999 || Socorro || LINEAR || EUN || align=right | 1.3 km || 
|-id=057 bgcolor=#E9E9E9
| 282057 ||  || — || October 12, 1999 || Socorro || LINEAR || — || align=right | 1.5 km || 
|-id=058 bgcolor=#E9E9E9
| 282058 ||  || — || October 7, 1999 || Catalina || CSS || EUN || align=right | 3.1 km || 
|-id=059 bgcolor=#E9E9E9
| 282059 ||  || — || October 9, 1999 || Kitt Peak || Spacewatch || — || align=right | 1.6 km || 
|-id=060 bgcolor=#d6d6d6
| 282060 ||  || — || October 3, 1999 || Socorro || LINEAR || — || align=right | 1.9 km || 
|-id=061 bgcolor=#E9E9E9
| 282061 ||  || — || October 3, 1999 || Socorro || LINEAR || — || align=right | 3.7 km || 
|-id=062 bgcolor=#E9E9E9
| 282062 ||  || — || October 31, 1999 || Kitt Peak || Spacewatch || — || align=right | 1.7 km || 
|-id=063 bgcolor=#E9E9E9
| 282063 ||  || — || November 3, 1999 || Catalina || CSS || — || align=right | 2.6 km || 
|-id=064 bgcolor=#E9E9E9
| 282064 ||  || — || November 3, 1999 || Socorro || LINEAR || — || align=right | 1.4 km || 
|-id=065 bgcolor=#d6d6d6
| 282065 ||  || — || November 9, 1999 || Socorro || LINEAR || — || align=right | 5.2 km || 
|-id=066 bgcolor=#d6d6d6
| 282066 ||  || — || November 30, 1999 || Kitt Peak || Spacewatch || — || align=right | 3.0 km || 
|-id=067 bgcolor=#E9E9E9
| 282067 ||  || — || December 5, 1999 || Socorro || LINEAR || — || align=right | 2.4 km || 
|-id=068 bgcolor=#fefefe
| 282068 ||  || — || December 7, 1999 || Socorro || LINEAR || H || align=right | 1.1 km || 
|-id=069 bgcolor=#E9E9E9
| 282069 ||  || — || December 6, 1999 || Socorro || LINEAR || EUN || align=right | 2.0 km || 
|-id=070 bgcolor=#E9E9E9
| 282070 ||  || — || December 7, 1999 || Socorro || LINEAR || — || align=right | 2.6 km || 
|-id=071 bgcolor=#E9E9E9
| 282071 ||  || — || December 8, 1999 || Socorro || LINEAR || — || align=right | 1.5 km || 
|-id=072 bgcolor=#E9E9E9
| 282072 ||  || — || December 7, 1999 || Catalina || CSS || — || align=right | 1.3 km || 
|-id=073 bgcolor=#E9E9E9
| 282073 ||  || — || December 5, 1999 || Kitt Peak || Spacewatch || — || align=right | 2.4 km || 
|-id=074 bgcolor=#E9E9E9
| 282074 ||  || — || January 3, 2000 || Socorro || LINEAR || — || align=right | 3.6 km || 
|-id=075 bgcolor=#fefefe
| 282075 ||  || — || February 7, 2000 || Kitt Peak || Spacewatch || — || align=right data-sort-value="0.74" | 740 m || 
|-id=076 bgcolor=#fefefe
| 282076 ||  || — || February 7, 2000 || Kitt Peak || Spacewatch || PHO || align=right | 2.5 km || 
|-id=077 bgcolor=#fefefe
| 282077 ||  || — || March 3, 2000 || Socorro || LINEAR || — || align=right data-sort-value="0.75" | 750 m || 
|-id=078 bgcolor=#fefefe
| 282078 ||  || — || April 5, 2000 || Socorro || LINEAR || — || align=right | 1.1 km || 
|-id=079 bgcolor=#d6d6d6
| 282079 ||  || — || April 24, 2000 || Anderson Mesa || LONEOS || — || align=right | 3.6 km || 
|-id=080 bgcolor=#fefefe
| 282080 ||  || — || June 5, 2000 || Kitt Peak || Spacewatch || FLO || align=right data-sort-value="0.88" | 880 m || 
|-id=081 bgcolor=#fefefe
| 282081 || 2000 NG || — || July 1, 2000 || Prescott || P. G. Comba || — || align=right | 1.3 km || 
|-id=082 bgcolor=#fefefe
| 282082 ||  || — || August 5, 2000 || Haleakala || NEAT || H || align=right data-sort-value="0.98" | 980 m || 
|-id=083 bgcolor=#fefefe
| 282083 ||  || — || August 9, 2000 || Socorro || LINEAR || PHO || align=right | 1.7 km || 
|-id=084 bgcolor=#fefefe
| 282084 ||  || — || August 25, 2000 || Socorro || LINEAR || — || align=right | 2.6 km || 
|-id=085 bgcolor=#fefefe
| 282085 ||  || — || August 25, 2000 || Socorro || LINEAR || NYS || align=right data-sort-value="0.83" | 830 m || 
|-id=086 bgcolor=#fefefe
| 282086 ||  || — || August 24, 2000 || Socorro || LINEAR || NYS || align=right data-sort-value="0.85" | 850 m || 
|-id=087 bgcolor=#fefefe
| 282087 ||  || — || August 26, 2000 || Socorro || LINEAR || NYS || align=right data-sort-value="0.72" | 720 m || 
|-id=088 bgcolor=#fefefe
| 282088 ||  || — || August 25, 2000 || Socorro || LINEAR || — || align=right | 1.0 km || 
|-id=089 bgcolor=#fefefe
| 282089 ||  || — || August 26, 2000 || Socorro || LINEAR || FLO || align=right data-sort-value="0.93" | 930 m || 
|-id=090 bgcolor=#d6d6d6
| 282090 ||  || — || August 31, 2000 || Socorro || LINEAR || — || align=right | 4.2 km || 
|-id=091 bgcolor=#d6d6d6
| 282091 ||  || — || August 31, 2000 || Socorro || LINEAR || — || align=right | 5.0 km || 
|-id=092 bgcolor=#fefefe
| 282092 ||  || — || August 31, 2000 || Socorro || LINEAR || — || align=right data-sort-value="0.96" | 960 m || 
|-id=093 bgcolor=#fefefe
| 282093 ||  || — || September 3, 2000 || Socorro || LINEAR || — || align=right | 1.3 km || 
|-id=094 bgcolor=#E9E9E9
| 282094 ||  || — || September 3, 2000 || Socorro || LINEAR || — || align=right | 4.4 km || 
|-id=095 bgcolor=#fefefe
| 282095 ||  || — || September 23, 2000 || Socorro || LINEAR || — || align=right | 1.6 km || 
|-id=096 bgcolor=#d6d6d6
| 282096 ||  || — || September 23, 2000 || Socorro || LINEAR || — || align=right | 4.3 km || 
|-id=097 bgcolor=#fefefe
| 282097 ||  || — || September 24, 2000 || Socorro || LINEAR || — || align=right | 1.2 km || 
|-id=098 bgcolor=#fefefe
| 282098 ||  || — || September 24, 2000 || Socorro || LINEAR || — || align=right | 1.2 km || 
|-id=099 bgcolor=#d6d6d6
| 282099 ||  || — || September 23, 2000 || Socorro || LINEAR || — || align=right | 5.5 km || 
|-id=100 bgcolor=#fefefe
| 282100 ||  || — || September 23, 2000 || Socorro || LINEAR || — || align=right | 1.2 km || 
|}

282101–282200 

|-bgcolor=#fefefe
| 282101 ||  || — || September 27, 2000 || Socorro || LINEAR || MAS || align=right | 1.0 km || 
|-id=102 bgcolor=#fefefe
| 282102 ||  || — || September 25, 2000 || Socorro || LINEAR || — || align=right | 1.3 km || 
|-id=103 bgcolor=#E9E9E9
| 282103 ||  || — || October 1, 2000 || Socorro || LINEAR || — || align=right | 1.4 km || 
|-id=104 bgcolor=#fefefe
| 282104 ||  || — || October 2, 2000 || Anderson Mesa || LONEOS || — || align=right | 1.7 km || 
|-id=105 bgcolor=#fefefe
| 282105 ||  || — || October 25, 2000 || Socorro || LINEAR || — || align=right | 1.3 km || 
|-id=106 bgcolor=#fefefe
| 282106 ||  || — || October 25, 2000 || Socorro || LINEAR || — || align=right | 1.5 km || 
|-id=107 bgcolor=#E9E9E9
| 282107 ||  || — || November 1, 2000 || Socorro || LINEAR || — || align=right | 1.2 km || 
|-id=108 bgcolor=#fefefe
| 282108 ||  || — || November 20, 2000 || Socorro || LINEAR || — || align=right | 1.7 km || 
|-id=109 bgcolor=#fefefe
| 282109 ||  || — || November 27, 2000 || Socorro || LINEAR || H || align=right data-sort-value="0.99" | 990 m || 
|-id=110 bgcolor=#fefefe
| 282110 ||  || — || November 20, 2000 || Socorro || LINEAR || — || align=right | 1.3 km || 
|-id=111 bgcolor=#E9E9E9
| 282111 ||  || — || November 27, 2000 || Kitt Peak || Spacewatch || — || align=right | 1.6 km || 
|-id=112 bgcolor=#fefefe
| 282112 ||  || — || November 20, 2000 || Anderson Mesa || LONEOS || V || align=right | 1.0 km || 
|-id=113 bgcolor=#fefefe
| 282113 ||  || — || November 26, 2000 || Socorro || LINEAR || — || align=right | 1.6 km || 
|-id=114 bgcolor=#E9E9E9
| 282114 ||  || — || November 27, 2000 || Socorro || LINEAR || — || align=right | 2.1 km || 
|-id=115 bgcolor=#E9E9E9
| 282115 ||  || — || December 30, 2000 || Socorro || LINEAR || — || align=right | 1.8 km || 
|-id=116 bgcolor=#E9E9E9
| 282116 ||  || — || January 2, 2001 || Socorro || LINEAR || — || align=right | 2.6 km || 
|-id=117 bgcolor=#fefefe
| 282117 ||  || — || January 2, 2001 || Socorro || LINEAR || FLO || align=right data-sort-value="0.89" | 890 m || 
|-id=118 bgcolor=#d6d6d6
| 282118 ||  || — || January 5, 2001 || Socorro || LINEAR || — || align=right | 4.4 km || 
|-id=119 bgcolor=#E9E9E9
| 282119 ||  || — || January 20, 2001 || Haleakala || NEAT || — || align=right | 1.9 km || 
|-id=120 bgcolor=#d6d6d6
| 282120 ||  || — || February 15, 2001 || Ondřejov || P. Pravec, L. Kotková || — || align=right | 5.0 km || 
|-id=121 bgcolor=#d6d6d6
| 282121 ||  || — || February 16, 2001 || Črni Vrh || Črni Vrh || — || align=right | 4.4 km || 
|-id=122 bgcolor=#E9E9E9
| 282122 ||  || — || February 16, 2001 || Kitt Peak || Spacewatch || — || align=right | 2.1 km || 
|-id=123 bgcolor=#E9E9E9
| 282123 ||  || — || February 19, 2001 || Socorro || LINEAR || PAE || align=right | 3.4 km || 
|-id=124 bgcolor=#E9E9E9
| 282124 ||  || — || March 18, 2001 || Anderson Mesa || LONEOS || INO || align=right | 1.7 km || 
|-id=125 bgcolor=#fefefe
| 282125 ||  || — || April 18, 2001 || Kitt Peak || Spacewatch || — || align=right data-sort-value="0.74" | 740 m || 
|-id=126 bgcolor=#FA8072
| 282126 ||  || — || June 18, 2001 || Anderson Mesa || LONEOS || — || align=right | 1.6 km || 
|-id=127 bgcolor=#fefefe
| 282127 ||  || — || June 20, 2001 || Haleakala || NEAT || — || align=right | 1.6 km || 
|-id=128 bgcolor=#FA8072
| 282128 ||  || — || July 13, 2001 || Haleakala || NEAT || — || align=right data-sort-value="0.97" | 970 m || 
|-id=129 bgcolor=#E9E9E9
| 282129 ||  || — || July 14, 2001 || Palomar || NEAT || — || align=right | 2.1 km || 
|-id=130 bgcolor=#fefefe
| 282130 ||  || — || July 22, 2001 || Palomar || NEAT || H || align=right | 1.1 km || 
|-id=131 bgcolor=#E9E9E9
| 282131 ||  || — || July 30, 2001 || Palomar || NEAT || — || align=right | 2.1 km || 
|-id=132 bgcolor=#fefefe
| 282132 ||  || — || August 11, 2001 || Palomar || NEAT || — || align=right | 1.1 km || 
|-id=133 bgcolor=#d6d6d6
| 282133 ||  || — || August 16, 2001 || Socorro || LINEAR || — || align=right | 2.4 km || 
|-id=134 bgcolor=#fefefe
| 282134 ||  || — || August 17, 2001 || Socorro || LINEAR || — || align=right data-sort-value="0.99" | 990 m || 
|-id=135 bgcolor=#fefefe
| 282135 ||  || — || August 20, 2001 || Socorro || LINEAR || — || align=right | 1.2 km || 
|-id=136 bgcolor=#fefefe
| 282136 ||  || — || August 21, 2001 || Socorro || LINEAR || — || align=right data-sort-value="0.97" | 970 m || 
|-id=137 bgcolor=#FA8072
| 282137 ||  || — || August 26, 2001 || Haleakala || NEAT || — || align=right data-sort-value="0.78" | 780 m || 
|-id=138 bgcolor=#fefefe
| 282138 ||  || — || August 25, 2001 || Socorro || LINEAR || PHO || align=right | 1.4 km || 
|-id=139 bgcolor=#d6d6d6
| 282139 ||  || — || August 23, 2001 || Anderson Mesa || LONEOS || — || align=right | 3.6 km || 
|-id=140 bgcolor=#d6d6d6
| 282140 ||  || — || August 24, 2001 || Haleakala || NEAT || — || align=right | 3.4 km || 
|-id=141 bgcolor=#FA8072
| 282141 ||  || — || August 24, 2001 || Socorro || LINEAR || — || align=right data-sort-value="0.68" | 680 m || 
|-id=142 bgcolor=#d6d6d6
| 282142 ||  || — || August 20, 2001 || Socorro || LINEAR || — || align=right | 4.6 km || 
|-id=143 bgcolor=#d6d6d6
| 282143 ||  || — || August 17, 2001 || Palomar || NEAT || — || align=right | 5.1 km || 
|-id=144 bgcolor=#fefefe
| 282144 ||  || — || August 25, 2001 || Anderson Mesa || LONEOS || FLO || align=right data-sort-value="0.81" | 810 m || 
|-id=145 bgcolor=#d6d6d6
| 282145 ||  || — || August 19, 2001 || Socorro || LINEAR || — || align=right | 4.5 km || 
|-id=146 bgcolor=#d6d6d6
| 282146 ||  || — || September 8, 2001 || Anderson Mesa || LONEOS || — || align=right | 4.4 km || 
|-id=147 bgcolor=#fefefe
| 282147 ||  || — || September 10, 2001 || Socorro || LINEAR || — || align=right data-sort-value="0.89" | 890 m || 
|-id=148 bgcolor=#fefefe
| 282148 ||  || — || September 12, 2001 || Socorro || LINEAR || H || align=right data-sort-value="0.66" | 660 m || 
|-id=149 bgcolor=#fefefe
| 282149 ||  || — || September 12, 2001 || Socorro || LINEAR || NYS || align=right data-sort-value="0.89" | 890 m || 
|-id=150 bgcolor=#fefefe
| 282150 ||  || — || September 10, 2001 || Socorro || LINEAR || — || align=right | 1.3 km || 
|-id=151 bgcolor=#fefefe
| 282151 ||  || — || September 11, 2001 || Anderson Mesa || LONEOS || FLO || align=right data-sort-value="0.67" | 670 m || 
|-id=152 bgcolor=#d6d6d6
| 282152 ||  || — || September 12, 2001 || Socorro || LINEAR || — || align=right | 3.7 km || 
|-id=153 bgcolor=#fefefe
| 282153 ||  || — || September 16, 2001 || Socorro || LINEAR || H || align=right data-sort-value="0.79" | 790 m || 
|-id=154 bgcolor=#fefefe
| 282154 ||  || — || September 16, 2001 || Socorro || LINEAR || — || align=right | 1.3 km || 
|-id=155 bgcolor=#d6d6d6
| 282155 ||  || — || September 16, 2001 || Socorro || LINEAR || — || align=right | 3.1 km || 
|-id=156 bgcolor=#fefefe
| 282156 ||  || — || September 16, 2001 || Socorro || LINEAR || H || align=right data-sort-value="0.71" | 710 m || 
|-id=157 bgcolor=#fefefe
| 282157 ||  || — || September 20, 2001 || Socorro || LINEAR || V || align=right data-sort-value="0.81" | 810 m || 
|-id=158 bgcolor=#fefefe
| 282158 ||  || — || September 20, 2001 || Socorro || LINEAR || V || align=right data-sort-value="0.80" | 800 m || 
|-id=159 bgcolor=#d6d6d6
| 282159 ||  || — || September 20, 2001 || Socorro || LINEAR || — || align=right | 7.1 km || 
|-id=160 bgcolor=#fefefe
| 282160 ||  || — || September 19, 2001 || Socorro || LINEAR || — || align=right data-sort-value="0.71" | 710 m || 
|-id=161 bgcolor=#fefefe
| 282161 ||  || — || September 20, 2001 || Socorro || LINEAR || H || align=right data-sort-value="0.76" | 760 m || 
|-id=162 bgcolor=#d6d6d6
| 282162 ||  || — || September 19, 2001 || Socorro || LINEAR || EOS || align=right | 2.7 km || 
|-id=163 bgcolor=#fefefe
| 282163 ||  || — || September 19, 2001 || Socorro || LINEAR || — || align=right data-sort-value="0.72" | 720 m || 
|-id=164 bgcolor=#d6d6d6
| 282164 ||  || — || September 19, 2001 || Socorro || LINEAR || — || align=right | 4.4 km || 
|-id=165 bgcolor=#d6d6d6
| 282165 ||  || — || September 19, 2001 || Socorro || LINEAR || — || align=right | 2.8 km || 
|-id=166 bgcolor=#d6d6d6
| 282166 ||  || — || September 19, 2001 || Socorro || LINEAR || — || align=right | 3.4 km || 
|-id=167 bgcolor=#fefefe
| 282167 ||  || — || September 21, 2001 || Kitt Peak || Spacewatch || — || align=right data-sort-value="0.60" | 600 m || 
|-id=168 bgcolor=#d6d6d6
| 282168 ||  || — || September 21, 2001 || Anderson Mesa || LONEOS || — || align=right | 4.4 km || 
|-id=169 bgcolor=#E9E9E9
| 282169 ||  || — || September 19, 2001 || Socorro || LINEAR || — || align=right | 2.6 km || 
|-id=170 bgcolor=#fefefe
| 282170 ||  || — || September 25, 2001 || Socorro || LINEAR || V || align=right data-sort-value="0.62" | 620 m || 
|-id=171 bgcolor=#fefefe
| 282171 ||  || — || September 23, 2001 || Haleakala || NEAT || — || align=right | 1.0 km || 
|-id=172 bgcolor=#d6d6d6
| 282172 ||  || — || September 26, 2001 || Socorro || LINEAR || — || align=right | 5.2 km || 
|-id=173 bgcolor=#d6d6d6
| 282173 ||  || — || September 28, 2001 || Socorro || LINEAR || — || align=right | 7.7 km || 
|-id=174 bgcolor=#fefefe
| 282174 ||  || — || October 11, 2001 || Desert Eagle || W. K. Y. Yeung || H || align=right data-sort-value="0.81" | 810 m || 
|-id=175 bgcolor=#fefefe
| 282175 ||  || — || October 13, 2001 || Socorro || LINEAR || H || align=right data-sort-value="0.89" | 890 m || 
|-id=176 bgcolor=#fefefe
| 282176 ||  || — || October 11, 2001 || Socorro || LINEAR || FLO || align=right | 1.1 km || 
|-id=177 bgcolor=#fefefe
| 282177 ||  || — || October 14, 2001 || Socorro || LINEAR || — || align=right | 1.2 km || 
|-id=178 bgcolor=#fefefe
| 282178 ||  || — || October 14, 2001 || Socorro || LINEAR || V || align=right data-sort-value="0.83" | 830 m || 
|-id=179 bgcolor=#d6d6d6
| 282179 ||  || — || October 15, 2001 || Socorro || LINEAR || — || align=right | 5.6 km || 
|-id=180 bgcolor=#fefefe
| 282180 ||  || — || October 15, 2001 || Socorro || LINEAR || H || align=right data-sort-value="0.99" | 990 m || 
|-id=181 bgcolor=#d6d6d6
| 282181 ||  || — || October 13, 2001 || Socorro || LINEAR || — || align=right | 3.0 km || 
|-id=182 bgcolor=#d6d6d6
| 282182 ||  || — || October 14, 2001 || Socorro || LINEAR || URS || align=right | 3.9 km || 
|-id=183 bgcolor=#d6d6d6
| 282183 ||  || — || October 14, 2001 || Socorro || LINEAR || MEL || align=right | 4.4 km || 
|-id=184 bgcolor=#fefefe
| 282184 ||  || — || October 14, 2001 || Socorro || LINEAR || FLO || align=right | 1.1 km || 
|-id=185 bgcolor=#d6d6d6
| 282185 ||  || — || October 14, 2001 || Socorro || LINEAR || — || align=right | 4.9 km || 
|-id=186 bgcolor=#d6d6d6
| 282186 ||  || — || October 14, 2001 || Socorro || LINEAR || EOS || align=right | 3.3 km || 
|-id=187 bgcolor=#fefefe
| 282187 ||  || — || October 14, 2001 || Socorro || LINEAR || — || align=right data-sort-value="0.91" | 910 m || 
|-id=188 bgcolor=#fefefe
| 282188 ||  || — || October 14, 2001 || Socorro || LINEAR || FLO || align=right data-sort-value="0.74" | 740 m || 
|-id=189 bgcolor=#E9E9E9
| 282189 ||  || — || October 14, 2001 || Socorro || LINEAR || GEF || align=right | 1.9 km || 
|-id=190 bgcolor=#fefefe
| 282190 ||  || — || October 11, 2001 || Eskridge || Farpoint Obs. || NYS || align=right data-sort-value="0.66" | 660 m || 
|-id=191 bgcolor=#E9E9E9
| 282191 ||  || — || October 13, 2001 || Palomar || NEAT || ADE || align=right | 2.3 km || 
|-id=192 bgcolor=#C2FFFF
| 282192 ||  || — || October 15, 2001 || Socorro || LINEAR || L5 || align=right | 12 km || 
|-id=193 bgcolor=#fefefe
| 282193 ||  || — || October 15, 2001 || Palomar || NEAT || — || align=right | 1.1 km || 
|-id=194 bgcolor=#d6d6d6
| 282194 ||  || — || October 14, 2001 || Apache Point || SDSS || VER || align=right | 3.5 km || 
|-id=195 bgcolor=#FA8072
| 282195 ||  || — || October 22, 2001 || Socorro || LINEAR || — || align=right data-sort-value="0.97" | 970 m || 
|-id=196 bgcolor=#E9E9E9
| 282196 ||  || — || October 16, 2001 || Socorro || LINEAR || — || align=right | 1.7 km || 
|-id=197 bgcolor=#fefefe
| 282197 ||  || — || October 17, 2001 || Socorro || LINEAR || — || align=right | 1.1 km || 
|-id=198 bgcolor=#C2FFFF
| 282198 ||  || — || October 23, 2001 || Kitt Peak || Spacewatch || L5 || align=right | 13 km || 
|-id=199 bgcolor=#fefefe
| 282199 ||  || — || October 16, 2001 || Socorro || LINEAR || H || align=right data-sort-value="0.98" | 980 m || 
|-id=200 bgcolor=#d6d6d6
| 282200 ||  || — || October 17, 2001 || Palomar || NEAT || — || align=right | 3.6 km || 
|}

282201–282300 

|-bgcolor=#d6d6d6
| 282201 ||  || — || October 25, 2001 || Kitt Peak || Spacewatch || EOS || align=right | 2.9 km || 
|-id=202 bgcolor=#fefefe
| 282202 ||  || — || November 9, 2001 || Socorro || LINEAR || V || align=right | 1.0 km || 
|-id=203 bgcolor=#d6d6d6
| 282203 ||  || — || November 10, 2001 || Socorro || LINEAR || LIX || align=right | 5.7 km || 
|-id=204 bgcolor=#d6d6d6
| 282204 ||  || — || November 10, 2001 || Socorro || LINEAR || — || align=right | 4.5 km || 
|-id=205 bgcolor=#d6d6d6
| 282205 ||  || — || November 10, 2001 || Socorro || LINEAR || EOS || align=right | 3.4 km || 
|-id=206 bgcolor=#fefefe
| 282206 ||  || — || November 10, 2001 || Socorro || LINEAR || V || align=right data-sort-value="0.73" | 730 m || 
|-id=207 bgcolor=#fefefe
| 282207 ||  || — || November 12, 2001 || Socorro || LINEAR || H || align=right data-sort-value="0.69" | 690 m || 
|-id=208 bgcolor=#d6d6d6
| 282208 ||  || — || November 15, 2001 || Socorro || LINEAR || — || align=right | 6.0 km || 
|-id=209 bgcolor=#E9E9E9
| 282209 ||  || — || November 12, 2001 || Socorro || LINEAR || — || align=right | 2.9 km || 
|-id=210 bgcolor=#E9E9E9
| 282210 ||  || — || November 17, 2001 || Socorro || LINEAR || NEM || align=right | 2.8 km || 
|-id=211 bgcolor=#fefefe
| 282211 ||  || — || November 19, 2001 || Socorro || LINEAR || V || align=right data-sort-value="0.98" | 980 m || 
|-id=212 bgcolor=#fefefe
| 282212 ||  || — || December 10, 2001 || Socorro || LINEAR || PHO || align=right | 2.1 km || 
|-id=213 bgcolor=#d6d6d6
| 282213 ||  || — || December 11, 2001 || Socorro || LINEAR || EOS || align=right | 3.4 km || 
|-id=214 bgcolor=#fefefe
| 282214 ||  || — || December 11, 2001 || Socorro || LINEAR || — || align=right | 1.2 km || 
|-id=215 bgcolor=#d6d6d6
| 282215 ||  || — || December 11, 2001 || Socorro || LINEAR || — || align=right | 4.8 km || 
|-id=216 bgcolor=#fefefe
| 282216 ||  || — || December 14, 2001 || Socorro || LINEAR || H || align=right | 1.0 km || 
|-id=217 bgcolor=#fefefe
| 282217 ||  || — || December 11, 2001 || Socorro || LINEAR || V || align=right | 1.00 km || 
|-id=218 bgcolor=#d6d6d6
| 282218 ||  || — || December 14, 2001 || Socorro || LINEAR || — || align=right | 3.1 km || 
|-id=219 bgcolor=#fefefe
| 282219 ||  || — || December 14, 2001 || Socorro || LINEAR || MAS || align=right data-sort-value="0.86" | 860 m || 
|-id=220 bgcolor=#fefefe
| 282220 ||  || — || December 15, 2001 || Socorro || LINEAR || FLO || align=right data-sort-value="0.89" | 890 m || 
|-id=221 bgcolor=#fefefe
| 282221 ||  || — || December 12, 2001 || Palomar || NEAT || NYS || align=right data-sort-value="0.74" | 740 m || 
|-id=222 bgcolor=#fefefe
| 282222 ||  || — || December 18, 2001 || Socorro || LINEAR || H || align=right | 1.0 km || 
|-id=223 bgcolor=#fefefe
| 282223 ||  || — || December 18, 2001 || Socorro || LINEAR || FLO || align=right | 1.0 km || 
|-id=224 bgcolor=#d6d6d6
| 282224 ||  || — || December 20, 2001 || Palomar || NEAT || — || align=right | 4.6 km || 
|-id=225 bgcolor=#E9E9E9
| 282225 ||  || — || December 19, 2001 || Cima Ekar || ADAS || — || align=right | 1.9 km || 
|-id=226 bgcolor=#FA8072
| 282226 ||  || — || January 9, 2002 || Socorro || LINEAR || — || align=right | 1.2 km || 
|-id=227 bgcolor=#fefefe
| 282227 ||  || — || January 6, 2002 || Haleakala || NEAT || H || align=right data-sort-value="0.87" | 870 m || 
|-id=228 bgcolor=#E9E9E9
| 282228 ||  || — || January 9, 2002 || Socorro || LINEAR || — || align=right | 2.0 km || 
|-id=229 bgcolor=#E9E9E9
| 282229 ||  || — || January 12, 2002 || Socorro || LINEAR || — || align=right | 1.1 km || 
|-id=230 bgcolor=#E9E9E9
| 282230 ||  || — || January 13, 2002 || Socorro || LINEAR || — || align=right | 1.2 km || 
|-id=231 bgcolor=#E9E9E9
| 282231 ||  || — || January 23, 2002 || Socorro || LINEAR || — || align=right | 3.5 km || 
|-id=232 bgcolor=#E9E9E9
| 282232 ||  || — || February 6, 2002 || Socorro || LINEAR || — || align=right | 2.8 km || 
|-id=233 bgcolor=#E9E9E9
| 282233 ||  || — || February 7, 2002 || Socorro || LINEAR || GER || align=right | 2.6 km || 
|-id=234 bgcolor=#E9E9E9
| 282234 ||  || — || February 10, 2002 || Socorro || LINEAR || — || align=right | 1.3 km || 
|-id=235 bgcolor=#E9E9E9
| 282235 ||  || — || February 10, 2002 || Socorro || LINEAR || — || align=right | 1.4 km || 
|-id=236 bgcolor=#E9E9E9
| 282236 ||  || — || February 11, 2002 || Socorro || LINEAR || — || align=right | 1.6 km || 
|-id=237 bgcolor=#E9E9E9
| 282237 ||  || — || February 7, 2002 || Kitt Peak || Spacewatch || — || align=right | 1.4 km || 
|-id=238 bgcolor=#d6d6d6
| 282238 ||  || — || February 8, 2002 || Kitt Peak || Spacewatch || — || align=right | 5.1 km || 
|-id=239 bgcolor=#E9E9E9
| 282239 ||  || — || February 15, 2002 || Socorro || LINEAR || — || align=right | 3.0 km || 
|-id=240 bgcolor=#E9E9E9
| 282240 ||  || — || February 6, 2002 || Palomar || NEAT || — || align=right | 1.4 km || 
|-id=241 bgcolor=#E9E9E9
| 282241 ||  || — || February 6, 2002 || Palomar || NEAT || — || align=right | 1.0 km || 
|-id=242 bgcolor=#E9E9E9
| 282242 ||  || — || February 19, 2002 || Socorro || LINEAR || — || align=right | 1.4 km || 
|-id=243 bgcolor=#E9E9E9
| 282243 ||  || — || March 11, 2002 || Haleakala || NEAT || — || align=right | 1.6 km || 
|-id=244 bgcolor=#E9E9E9
| 282244 ||  || — || March 12, 2002 || Apache Point || SDSS || — || align=right | 2.1 km || 
|-id=245 bgcolor=#E9E9E9
| 282245 ||  || — || April 13, 2002 || Palomar || NEAT || MIT || align=right | 2.6 km || 
|-id=246 bgcolor=#E9E9E9
| 282246 ||  || — || April 12, 2002 || Desert Eagle || W. K. Y. Yeung || — || align=right | 4.1 km || 
|-id=247 bgcolor=#E9E9E9
| 282247 ||  || — || April 5, 2002 || Palomar || NEAT || — || align=right | 1.9 km || 
|-id=248 bgcolor=#E9E9E9
| 282248 ||  || — || April 8, 2002 || Palomar || NEAT || — || align=right | 2.7 km || 
|-id=249 bgcolor=#d6d6d6
| 282249 ||  || — || April 8, 2002 || Palomar || NEAT || — || align=right | 5.0 km || 
|-id=250 bgcolor=#E9E9E9
| 282250 ||  || — || April 11, 2002 || Socorro || LINEAR || — || align=right | 1.4 km || 
|-id=251 bgcolor=#E9E9E9
| 282251 ||  || — || April 15, 2002 || Palomar || NEAT || — || align=right | 2.1 km || 
|-id=252 bgcolor=#d6d6d6
| 282252 ||  || — || April 2, 2002 || Kitt Peak || Spacewatch || — || align=right | 4.5 km || 
|-id=253 bgcolor=#E9E9E9
| 282253 ||  || — || April 8, 2002 || Palomar || NEAT || — || align=right | 2.1 km || 
|-id=254 bgcolor=#E9E9E9
| 282254 ||  || — || April 21, 2002 || Palomar || NEAT || — || align=right | 2.5 km || 
|-id=255 bgcolor=#E9E9E9
| 282255 ||  || — || May 9, 2002 || Socorro || LINEAR || EUN || align=right | 1.5 km || 
|-id=256 bgcolor=#E9E9E9
| 282256 ||  || — || May 10, 2002 || Socorro || LINEAR || — || align=right | 2.6 km || 
|-id=257 bgcolor=#E9E9E9
| 282257 ||  || — || May 9, 2002 || Socorro || LINEAR || JUN || align=right | 1.4 km || 
|-id=258 bgcolor=#fefefe
| 282258 ||  || — || May 11, 2002 || Socorro || LINEAR || NYS || align=right data-sort-value="0.74" | 740 m || 
|-id=259 bgcolor=#E9E9E9
| 282259 ||  || — || May 13, 2002 || Palomar || NEAT || — || align=right | 2.1 km || 
|-id=260 bgcolor=#E9E9E9
| 282260 ||  || — || May 4, 2002 || Palomar || NEAT || JUN || align=right | 1.4 km || 
|-id=261 bgcolor=#E9E9E9
| 282261 ||  || — || May 4, 2002 || Palomar || NEAT || — || align=right | 1.8 km || 
|-id=262 bgcolor=#E9E9E9
| 282262 ||  || — || April 9, 2002 || Socorro || LINEAR || — || align=right | 2.7 km || 
|-id=263 bgcolor=#E9E9E9
| 282263 ||  || — || May 14, 2002 || Socorro || LINEAR || ADE || align=right | 3.8 km || 
|-id=264 bgcolor=#E9E9E9
| 282264 ||  || — || May 10, 2002 || Palomar || NEAT || — || align=right | 2.3 km || 
|-id=265 bgcolor=#E9E9E9
| 282265 ||  || — || May 30, 2002 || Palomar || NEAT || MAR || align=right | 1.7 km || 
|-id=266 bgcolor=#E9E9E9
| 282266 ||  || — || June 6, 2002 || Socorro || LINEAR || — || align=right | 2.0 km || 
|-id=267 bgcolor=#E9E9E9
| 282267 ||  || — || June 12, 2002 || Palomar || NEAT || MAR || align=right | 1.5 km || 
|-id=268 bgcolor=#E9E9E9
| 282268 ||  || — || July 1, 2002 || Palomar || NEAT || — || align=right | 2.5 km || 
|-id=269 bgcolor=#E9E9E9
| 282269 ||  || — || July 13, 2002 || Haleakala || NEAT || — || align=right | 2.7 km || 
|-id=270 bgcolor=#E9E9E9
| 282270 ||  || — || July 9, 2002 || Socorro || LINEAR || — || align=right | 4.7 km || 
|-id=271 bgcolor=#E9E9E9
| 282271 ||  || — || July 9, 2002 || Palomar || NEAT || — || align=right | 2.9 km || 
|-id=272 bgcolor=#d6d6d6
| 282272 ||  || — || October 21, 2003 || Kitt Peak || Spacewatch || — || align=right | 3.7 km || 
|-id=273 bgcolor=#E9E9E9
| 282273 ||  || — || October 9, 2007 || Kitt Peak || Spacewatch || — || align=right | 2.1 km || 
|-id=274 bgcolor=#E9E9E9
| 282274 ||  || — || July 20, 2002 || Palomar || NEAT || GEF || align=right | 1.5 km || 
|-id=275 bgcolor=#E9E9E9
| 282275 ||  || — || July 25, 2002 || Palomar || NEAT || — || align=right | 3.2 km || 
|-id=276 bgcolor=#E9E9E9
| 282276 ||  || — || July 18, 2002 || Socorro || LINEAR || INO || align=right | 1.7 km || 
|-id=277 bgcolor=#E9E9E9
| 282277 ||  || — || July 18, 2002 || Socorro || LINEAR || GEF || align=right | 1.7 km || 
|-id=278 bgcolor=#E9E9E9
| 282278 ||  || — || July 18, 2002 || Socorro || LINEAR || — || align=right | 3.9 km || 
|-id=279 bgcolor=#E9E9E9
| 282279 ||  || — || July 18, 2002 || Socorro || LINEAR || — || align=right | 3.1 km || 
|-id=280 bgcolor=#E9E9E9
| 282280 ||  || — || July 18, 2002 || Palomar || NEAT || — || align=right | 2.7 km || 
|-id=281 bgcolor=#E9E9E9
| 282281 ||  || — || August 6, 2002 || Palomar || NEAT || — || align=right | 3.0 km || 
|-id=282 bgcolor=#E9E9E9
| 282282 ||  || — || August 6, 2002 || Palomar || NEAT || WIT || align=right | 1.4 km || 
|-id=283 bgcolor=#E9E9E9
| 282283 ||  || — || August 4, 2002 || Socorro || LINEAR || — || align=right | 2.8 km || 
|-id=284 bgcolor=#E9E9E9
| 282284 ||  || — || August 4, 2002 || Palomar || NEAT || — || align=right | 2.8 km || 
|-id=285 bgcolor=#E9E9E9
| 282285 ||  || — || August 11, 2002 || Socorro || LINEAR || — || align=right | 3.9 km || 
|-id=286 bgcolor=#E9E9E9
| 282286 ||  || — || August 10, 2002 || Socorro || LINEAR || — || align=right | 2.7 km || 
|-id=287 bgcolor=#E9E9E9
| 282287 ||  || — || August 11, 2002 || Socorro || LINEAR || — || align=right | 4.3 km || 
|-id=288 bgcolor=#E9E9E9
| 282288 ||  || — || August 13, 2002 || Socorro || LINEAR || WAT || align=right | 2.1 km || 
|-id=289 bgcolor=#E9E9E9
| 282289 ||  || — || August 13, 2002 || Anderson Mesa || LONEOS || — || align=right | 2.9 km || 
|-id=290 bgcolor=#E9E9E9
| 282290 ||  || — || August 14, 2002 || Socorro || LINEAR || GEF || align=right | 2.0 km || 
|-id=291 bgcolor=#E9E9E9
| 282291 ||  || — || August 7, 2002 || Palomar || NEAT || — || align=right | 2.8 km || 
|-id=292 bgcolor=#E9E9E9
| 282292 ||  || — || August 15, 2002 || Palomar || NEAT || — || align=right | 3.1 km || 
|-id=293 bgcolor=#E9E9E9
| 282293 ||  || — || August 16, 2002 || Socorro || LINEAR || GEF || align=right | 2.3 km || 
|-id=294 bgcolor=#E9E9E9
| 282294 ||  || — || August 16, 2002 || Palomar || NEAT || — || align=right | 3.5 km || 
|-id=295 bgcolor=#E9E9E9
| 282295 ||  || — || August 26, 2002 || Palomar || NEAT || GEF || align=right | 2.1 km || 
|-id=296 bgcolor=#d6d6d6
| 282296 ||  || — || August 30, 2002 || Kitt Peak || Spacewatch || TRE || align=right | 2.7 km || 
|-id=297 bgcolor=#E9E9E9
| 282297 ||  || — || August 28, 2002 || Palomar || NEAT || — || align=right | 3.4 km || 
|-id=298 bgcolor=#E9E9E9
| 282298 ||  || — || August 16, 2002 || Palomar || NEAT || DOR || align=right | 2.7 km || 
|-id=299 bgcolor=#d6d6d6
| 282299 ||  || — || August 18, 2002 || Palomar || NEAT || — || align=right | 2.5 km || 
|-id=300 bgcolor=#E9E9E9
| 282300 ||  || — || August 29, 2002 || Palomar || NEAT || — || align=right | 2.9 km || 
|}

282301–282400 

|-bgcolor=#E9E9E9
| 282301 ||  || — || September 3, 2002 || Palomar || NEAT || — || align=right | 1.7 km || 
|-id=302 bgcolor=#E9E9E9
| 282302 ||  || — || September 3, 2002 || Palomar || NEAT || — || align=right | 4.1 km || 
|-id=303 bgcolor=#E9E9E9
| 282303 ||  || — || September 3, 2002 || Palomar || NEAT || INO || align=right | 1.8 km || 
|-id=304 bgcolor=#E9E9E9
| 282304 ||  || — || September 29, 2002 || Haleakala || NEAT || — || align=right | 2.5 km || 
|-id=305 bgcolor=#E9E9E9
| 282305 ||  || — || September 17, 2002 || Palomar || NEAT || — || align=right | 2.7 km || 
|-id=306 bgcolor=#E9E9E9
| 282306 ||  || — || October 1, 2002 || Socorro || LINEAR || — || align=right | 3.7 km || 
|-id=307 bgcolor=#E9E9E9
| 282307 ||  || — || October 1, 2002 || Anderson Mesa || LONEOS || — || align=right | 2.6 km || 
|-id=308 bgcolor=#fefefe
| 282308 ||  || — || October 2, 2002 || Socorro || LINEAR || — || align=right data-sort-value="0.79" | 790 m || 
|-id=309 bgcolor=#d6d6d6
| 282309 ||  || — || October 3, 2002 || Palomar || NEAT || — || align=right | 4.4 km || 
|-id=310 bgcolor=#fefefe
| 282310 ||  || — || October 1, 2002 || Haleakala || NEAT || — || align=right | 1.4 km || 
|-id=311 bgcolor=#E9E9E9
| 282311 ||  || — || October 3, 2002 || Palomar || NEAT || — || align=right | 3.3 km || 
|-id=312 bgcolor=#E9E9E9
| 282312 ||  || — || October 3, 2002 || Palomar || NEAT || GEF || align=right | 2.0 km || 
|-id=313 bgcolor=#E9E9E9
| 282313 ||  || — || October 3, 2002 || Palomar || NEAT || — || align=right | 3.4 km || 
|-id=314 bgcolor=#E9E9E9
| 282314 ||  || — || October 3, 2002 || Palomar || NEAT || — || align=right | 4.8 km || 
|-id=315 bgcolor=#d6d6d6
| 282315 ||  || — || October 4, 2002 || Socorro || LINEAR || — || align=right | 3.4 km || 
|-id=316 bgcolor=#E9E9E9
| 282316 ||  || — || October 4, 2002 || Anderson Mesa || LONEOS || — || align=right | 3.2 km || 
|-id=317 bgcolor=#E9E9E9
| 282317 ||  || — || October 4, 2002 || Anderson Mesa || LONEOS || — || align=right | 5.0 km || 
|-id=318 bgcolor=#d6d6d6
| 282318 ||  || — || October 4, 2002 || Socorro || LINEAR || — || align=right | 3.4 km || 
|-id=319 bgcolor=#d6d6d6
| 282319 ||  || — || October 5, 2002 || Palomar || NEAT || EOS || align=right | 2.6 km || 
|-id=320 bgcolor=#d6d6d6
| 282320 ||  || — || October 4, 2002 || Palomar || NEAT || BRA || align=right | 2.3 km || 
|-id=321 bgcolor=#E9E9E9
| 282321 ||  || — || October 5, 2002 || Anderson Mesa || LONEOS || — || align=right | 3.4 km || 
|-id=322 bgcolor=#fefefe
| 282322 ||  || — || October 3, 2002 || Socorro || LINEAR || — || align=right | 1.0 km || 
|-id=323 bgcolor=#E9E9E9
| 282323 ||  || — || October 5, 2002 || Socorro || LINEAR || — || align=right | 3.0 km || 
|-id=324 bgcolor=#E9E9E9
| 282324 ||  || — || October 8, 2002 || Palomar || NEAT || — || align=right | 3.4 km || 
|-id=325 bgcolor=#E9E9E9
| 282325 ||  || — || October 6, 2002 || Socorro || LINEAR || INO || align=right | 2.0 km || 
|-id=326 bgcolor=#d6d6d6
| 282326 ||  || — || October 4, 2002 || Apache Point || SDSS || — || align=right | 2.9 km || 
|-id=327 bgcolor=#d6d6d6
| 282327 ||  || — || October 4, 2002 || Apache Point || SDSS || — || align=right | 4.4 km || 
|-id=328 bgcolor=#d6d6d6
| 282328 ||  || — || October 4, 2002 || Apache Point || SDSS || — || align=right | 5.1 km || 
|-id=329 bgcolor=#d6d6d6
| 282329 ||  || — || October 4, 2002 || Apache Point || SDSS || EOS || align=right | 4.5 km || 
|-id=330 bgcolor=#d6d6d6
| 282330 ||  || — || October 15, 2002 || Palomar || NEAT || EOS || align=right | 2.6 km || 
|-id=331 bgcolor=#d6d6d6
| 282331 ||  || — || October 31, 2002 || Palomar || NEAT || EOS || align=right | 2.8 km || 
|-id=332 bgcolor=#d6d6d6
| 282332 ||  || — || October 30, 2002 || Kitt Peak || Spacewatch || — || align=right | 3.5 km || 
|-id=333 bgcolor=#E9E9E9
| 282333 ||  || — || October 29, 2002 || Apache Point || SDSS || — || align=right | 2.1 km || 
|-id=334 bgcolor=#d6d6d6
| 282334 ||  || — || October 29, 2002 || Apache Point || SDSS || EOS || align=right | 2.5 km || 
|-id=335 bgcolor=#d6d6d6
| 282335 ||  || — || October 30, 2002 || Haleakala || NEAT || EOS || align=right | 2.9 km || 
|-id=336 bgcolor=#C2FFFF
| 282336 ||  || — || November 1, 2002 || Palomar || NEAT || L5 || align=right | 14 km || 
|-id=337 bgcolor=#d6d6d6
| 282337 ||  || — || November 1, 2002 || Palomar || NEAT || EOS || align=right | 2.4 km || 
|-id=338 bgcolor=#fefefe
| 282338 ||  || — || November 1, 2002 || Palomar || NEAT || — || align=right | 1.3 km || 
|-id=339 bgcolor=#E9E9E9
| 282339 ||  || — || November 12, 2002 || Socorro || LINEAR || — || align=right | 2.9 km || 
|-id=340 bgcolor=#d6d6d6
| 282340 ||  || — || December 2, 2002 || Socorro || LINEAR || — || align=right | 4.5 km || 
|-id=341 bgcolor=#d6d6d6
| 282341 ||  || — || December 6, 2002 || Socorro || LINEAR || — || align=right | 4.4 km || 
|-id=342 bgcolor=#fefefe
| 282342 ||  || — || December 6, 2002 || Socorro || LINEAR || NYS || align=right data-sort-value="0.71" | 710 m || 
|-id=343 bgcolor=#fefefe
| 282343 ||  || — || December 8, 2002 || Haleakala || NEAT || — || align=right | 1.4 km || 
|-id=344 bgcolor=#d6d6d6
| 282344 ||  || — || December 7, 2002 || Palomar || NEAT || — || align=right | 3.5 km || 
|-id=345 bgcolor=#E9E9E9
| 282345 ||  || — || December 28, 2002 || Socorro || LINEAR || BAR || align=right | 2.0 km || 
|-id=346 bgcolor=#d6d6d6
| 282346 ||  || — || December 28, 2002 || Kitt Peak || Spacewatch || EOS || align=right | 2.8 km || 
|-id=347 bgcolor=#FA8072
| 282347 ||  || — || January 7, 2003 || Socorro || LINEAR || PHO || align=right | 2.1 km || 
|-id=348 bgcolor=#fefefe
| 282348 ||  || — || January 7, 2003 || Socorro || LINEAR || H || align=right data-sort-value="0.80" | 800 m || 
|-id=349 bgcolor=#E9E9E9
| 282349 ||  || — || January 28, 2003 || Kitt Peak || Spacewatch || — || align=right | 3.1 km || 
|-id=350 bgcolor=#d6d6d6
| 282350 ||  || — || January 28, 2003 || Haleakala || NEAT || ALA || align=right | 8.3 km || 
|-id=351 bgcolor=#fefefe
| 282351 ||  || — || February 22, 2003 || Palomar || NEAT || — || align=right | 1.0 km || 
|-id=352 bgcolor=#E9E9E9
| 282352 ||  || — || March 27, 2003 || Palomar || NEAT || JUN || align=right | 1.3 km || 
|-id=353 bgcolor=#E9E9E9
| 282353 ||  || — || March 29, 2003 || Anderson Mesa || LONEOS || — || align=right | 1.6 km || 
|-id=354 bgcolor=#E9E9E9
| 282354 ||  || — || March 31, 2003 || Anderson Mesa || LONEOS || — || align=right | 1.4 km || 
|-id=355 bgcolor=#fefefe
| 282355 ||  || — || March 30, 2003 || Kitt Peak || M. W. Buie || V || align=right data-sort-value="0.93" | 930 m || 
|-id=356 bgcolor=#E9E9E9
| 282356 ||  || — || April 1, 2003 || Socorro || LINEAR || — || align=right | 3.1 km || 
|-id=357 bgcolor=#fefefe
| 282357 ||  || — || April 22, 2003 || Siding Spring || R. H. McNaught || — || align=right data-sort-value="0.86" | 860 m || 
|-id=358 bgcolor=#fefefe
| 282358 ||  || — || April 24, 2003 || Kitt Peak || Spacewatch || — || align=right | 1.0 km || 
|-id=359 bgcolor=#fefefe
| 282359 ||  || — || April 25, 2003 || Campo Imperatore || CINEOS || — || align=right | 1.3 km || 
|-id=360 bgcolor=#fefefe
| 282360 ||  || — || April 25, 2003 || Socorro || LINEAR || H || align=right data-sort-value="0.73" | 730 m || 
|-id=361 bgcolor=#E9E9E9
| 282361 ||  || — || May 29, 2003 || Kitt Peak || Spacewatch || — || align=right | 1.7 km || 
|-id=362 bgcolor=#E9E9E9
| 282362 ||  || — || June 3, 2003 || Anderson Mesa || LONEOS || — || align=right | 2.2 km || 
|-id=363 bgcolor=#E9E9E9
| 282363 ||  || — || June 22, 2003 || Anderson Mesa || LONEOS || — || align=right | 1.8 km || 
|-id=364 bgcolor=#fefefe
| 282364 ||  || — || July 2, 2003 || Socorro || LINEAR || H || align=right data-sort-value="0.78" | 780 m || 
|-id=365 bgcolor=#E9E9E9
| 282365 ||  || — || July 3, 2003 || Kitt Peak || Spacewatch || — || align=right | 1.7 km || 
|-id=366 bgcolor=#E9E9E9
| 282366 ||  || — || July 27, 2003 || Reedy Creek || J. Broughton || — || align=right | 1.9 km || 
|-id=367 bgcolor=#E9E9E9
| 282367 ||  || — || July 21, 2003 || Palomar || NEAT || BAR || align=right | 1.4 km || 
|-id=368 bgcolor=#E9E9E9
| 282368 ||  || — || July 25, 2003 || Socorro || LINEAR || — || align=right | 2.0 km || 
|-id=369 bgcolor=#E9E9E9
| 282369 ||  || — || July 30, 2003 || Palomar || NEAT || MIT || align=right | 2.9 km || 
|-id=370 bgcolor=#E9E9E9
| 282370 ||  || — || August 1, 2003 || Socorro || LINEAR || BRU || align=right | 5.5 km || 
|-id=371 bgcolor=#E9E9E9
| 282371 ||  || — || August 4, 2003 || Haleakala || NEAT || — || align=right | 2.0 km || 
|-id=372 bgcolor=#E9E9E9
| 282372 ||  || — || August 20, 2003 || Palomar || NEAT || — || align=right | 1.3 km || 
|-id=373 bgcolor=#fefefe
| 282373 ||  || — || August 20, 2003 || Campo Imperatore || CINEOS || V || align=right data-sort-value="0.88" | 880 m || 
|-id=374 bgcolor=#E9E9E9
| 282374 ||  || — || August 20, 2003 || Palomar || NEAT || — || align=right | 2.3 km || 
|-id=375 bgcolor=#E9E9E9
| 282375 ||  || — || August 22, 2003 || Palomar || NEAT || — || align=right | 1.8 km || 
|-id=376 bgcolor=#E9E9E9
| 282376 ||  || — || August 22, 2003 || Socorro || LINEAR || — || align=right | 1.0 km || 
|-id=377 bgcolor=#E9E9E9
| 282377 ||  || — || August 23, 2003 || Socorro || LINEAR || — || align=right | 2.5 km || 
|-id=378 bgcolor=#E9E9E9
| 282378 ||  || — || August 23, 2003 || Socorro || LINEAR || — || align=right | 5.6 km || 
|-id=379 bgcolor=#E9E9E9
| 282379 ||  || — || August 25, 2003 || Palomar || NEAT || — || align=right | 4.3 km || 
|-id=380 bgcolor=#E9E9E9
| 282380 ||  || — || August 25, 2003 || Palomar || NEAT || — || align=right | 3.6 km || 
|-id=381 bgcolor=#E9E9E9
| 282381 ||  || — || August 26, 2003 || Haleakala || NEAT || EUN || align=right | 1.7 km || 
|-id=382 bgcolor=#E9E9E9
| 282382 ||  || — || September 1, 2003 || Socorro || LINEAR || EUN || align=right | 1.5 km || 
|-id=383 bgcolor=#E9E9E9
| 282383 ||  || — || September 15, 2003 || Palomar || NEAT || — || align=right | 1.8 km || 
|-id=384 bgcolor=#d6d6d6
| 282384 ||  || — || September 17, 2003 || Kitt Peak || Spacewatch || VER || align=right | 5.8 km || 
|-id=385 bgcolor=#fefefe
| 282385 ||  || — || September 18, 2003 || Palomar || NEAT || — || align=right | 1.1 km || 
|-id=386 bgcolor=#d6d6d6
| 282386 ||  || — || September 18, 2003 || Palomar || NEAT || — || align=right | 4.9 km || 
|-id=387 bgcolor=#d6d6d6
| 282387 ||  || — || September 16, 2003 || Palomar || NEAT || — || align=right | 2.9 km || 
|-id=388 bgcolor=#E9E9E9
| 282388 ||  || — || September 19, 2003 || Haleakala || NEAT || — || align=right | 1.4 km || 
|-id=389 bgcolor=#E9E9E9
| 282389 ||  || — || September 19, 2003 || Palomar || NEAT || — || align=right | 1.3 km || 
|-id=390 bgcolor=#E9E9E9
| 282390 ||  || — || September 16, 2003 || Kitt Peak || Spacewatch || AST || align=right | 1.7 km || 
|-id=391 bgcolor=#fefefe
| 282391 ||  || — || September 19, 2003 || Kitt Peak || Spacewatch || — || align=right | 1.0 km || 
|-id=392 bgcolor=#E9E9E9
| 282392 ||  || — || September 18, 2003 || Haleakala || NEAT || — || align=right | 2.3 km || 
|-id=393 bgcolor=#E9E9E9
| 282393 ||  || — || September 20, 2003 || Palomar || NEAT || AER || align=right | 1.8 km || 
|-id=394 bgcolor=#E9E9E9
| 282394 ||  || — || September 20, 2003 || Palomar || NEAT || — || align=right | 3.1 km || 
|-id=395 bgcolor=#E9E9E9
| 282395 ||  || — || September 27, 2003 || Socorro || LINEAR || BRU || align=right | 6.5 km || 
|-id=396 bgcolor=#E9E9E9
| 282396 ||  || — || September 27, 2003 || Socorro || LINEAR || — || align=right | 1.5 km || 
|-id=397 bgcolor=#E9E9E9
| 282397 ||  || — || September 28, 2003 || Socorro || LINEAR || — || align=right | 1.8 km || 
|-id=398 bgcolor=#E9E9E9
| 282398 ||  || — || September 27, 2003 || Socorro || LINEAR || — || align=right | 1.4 km || 
|-id=399 bgcolor=#E9E9E9
| 282399 ||  || — || September 28, 2003 || Socorro || LINEAR || — || align=right | 4.2 km || 
|-id=400 bgcolor=#E9E9E9
| 282400 ||  || — || September 17, 2003 || Palomar || NEAT || — || align=right | 3.0 km || 
|}

282401–282500 

|-bgcolor=#E9E9E9
| 282401 ||  || — || September 17, 2003 || Palomar || NEAT || — || align=right | 2.9 km || 
|-id=402 bgcolor=#E9E9E9
| 282402 ||  || — || September 17, 2003 || Palomar || NEAT || — || align=right | 2.9 km || 
|-id=403 bgcolor=#E9E9E9
| 282403 ||  || — || September 18, 2003 || Kitt Peak || Spacewatch || — || align=right | 2.6 km || 
|-id=404 bgcolor=#E9E9E9
| 282404 ||  || — || September 26, 2003 || Apache Point || SDSS || — || align=right | 3.2 km || 
|-id=405 bgcolor=#fefefe
| 282405 ||  || — || October 5, 2003 || Socorro || LINEAR || H || align=right data-sort-value="0.84" | 840 m || 
|-id=406 bgcolor=#E9E9E9
| 282406 ||  || — || October 1, 2003 || Anderson Mesa || LONEOS || — || align=right | 2.8 km || 
|-id=407 bgcolor=#fefefe
| 282407 ||  || — || October 5, 2003 || Kitt Peak || Spacewatch || — || align=right | 1.1 km || 
|-id=408 bgcolor=#E9E9E9
| 282408 ||  || — || October 18, 2003 || Kvistaberg || UDAS || ADE || align=right | 3.0 km || 
|-id=409 bgcolor=#fefefe
| 282409 ||  || — || October 20, 2003 || Socorro || LINEAR || H || align=right | 1.1 km || 
|-id=410 bgcolor=#E9E9E9
| 282410 ||  || — || October 16, 2003 || Kitt Peak || Spacewatch || — || align=right | 2.0 km || 
|-id=411 bgcolor=#E9E9E9
| 282411 ||  || — || October 17, 2003 || Kitt Peak || Spacewatch || WIT || align=right | 1.3 km || 
|-id=412 bgcolor=#E9E9E9
| 282412 ||  || — || October 16, 2003 || Anderson Mesa || LONEOS || RAF || align=right | 1.4 km || 
|-id=413 bgcolor=#E9E9E9
| 282413 ||  || — || October 18, 2003 || Anderson Mesa || LONEOS || — || align=right | 2.5 km || 
|-id=414 bgcolor=#E9E9E9
| 282414 ||  || — || October 21, 2003 || Socorro || LINEAR || — || align=right | 3.1 km || 
|-id=415 bgcolor=#E9E9E9
| 282415 ||  || — || October 21, 2003 || Socorro || LINEAR || — || align=right | 3.2 km || 
|-id=416 bgcolor=#E9E9E9
| 282416 ||  || — || October 21, 2003 || Palomar || NEAT || — || align=right | 2.9 km || 
|-id=417 bgcolor=#E9E9E9
| 282417 ||  || — || October 22, 2003 || Socorro || LINEAR || HNS || align=right | 1.9 km || 
|-id=418 bgcolor=#E9E9E9
| 282418 ||  || — || October 23, 2003 || Haleakala || NEAT || — || align=right | 1.6 km || 
|-id=419 bgcolor=#E9E9E9
| 282419 ||  || — || October 22, 2003 || Socorro || LINEAR || — || align=right | 1.3 km || 
|-id=420 bgcolor=#E9E9E9
| 282420 ||  || — || October 25, 2003 || Socorro || LINEAR || — || align=right | 2.8 km || 
|-id=421 bgcolor=#E9E9E9
| 282421 ||  || — || October 30, 2003 || Socorro || LINEAR || — || align=right | 2.6 km || 
|-id=422 bgcolor=#E9E9E9
| 282422 ||  || — || October 16, 2003 || Kitt Peak || Spacewatch || — || align=right | 2.5 km || 
|-id=423 bgcolor=#E9E9E9
| 282423 ||  || — || October 17, 2003 || Apache Point || SDSS || — || align=right | 4.6 km || 
|-id=424 bgcolor=#E9E9E9
| 282424 ||  || — || October 20, 2003 || Kitt Peak || Spacewatch || — || align=right | 3.0 km || 
|-id=425 bgcolor=#E9E9E9
| 282425 ||  || — || October 22, 2003 || Apache Point || SDSS || — || align=right | 1.1 km || 
|-id=426 bgcolor=#E9E9E9
| 282426 ||  || — || October 22, 2003 || Apache Point || SDSS || — || align=right | 3.3 km || 
|-id=427 bgcolor=#d6d6d6
| 282427 ||  || — || November 20, 2003 || Socorro || LINEAR || — || align=right | 4.4 km || 
|-id=428 bgcolor=#fefefe
| 282428 ||  || — || November 19, 2003 || Kitt Peak || Spacewatch || MAS || align=right data-sort-value="0.87" | 870 m || 
|-id=429 bgcolor=#E9E9E9
| 282429 ||  || — || November 20, 2003 || Socorro || LINEAR || GEF || align=right | 1.9 km || 
|-id=430 bgcolor=#fefefe
| 282430 ||  || — || November 21, 2003 || Socorro || LINEAR || FLO || align=right data-sort-value="0.82" | 820 m || 
|-id=431 bgcolor=#E9E9E9
| 282431 ||  || — || November 21, 2003 || Socorro || LINEAR || — || align=right | 2.4 km || 
|-id=432 bgcolor=#E9E9E9
| 282432 ||  || — || November 16, 2003 || Catalina || CSS || — || align=right | 3.3 km || 
|-id=433 bgcolor=#E9E9E9
| 282433 ||  || — || November 21, 2003 || Socorro || LINEAR || — || align=right | 2.7 km || 
|-id=434 bgcolor=#E9E9E9
| 282434 ||  || — || November 21, 2003 || Socorro || LINEAR || — || align=right | 5.7 km || 
|-id=435 bgcolor=#E9E9E9
| 282435 ||  || — || November 30, 2003 || Socorro || LINEAR || — || align=right | 3.7 km || 
|-id=436 bgcolor=#d6d6d6
| 282436 ||  || — || November 21, 2003 || Catalina || CSS || — || align=right | 4.2 km || 
|-id=437 bgcolor=#E9E9E9
| 282437 ||  || — || December 3, 2003 || Socorro || LINEAR || EUN || align=right | 2.2 km || 
|-id=438 bgcolor=#E9E9E9
| 282438 ||  || — || December 15, 2003 || Palomar || NEAT || — || align=right | 3.5 km || 
|-id=439 bgcolor=#E9E9E9
| 282439 ||  || — || December 14, 2003 || Socorro || LINEAR || — || align=right | 3.8 km || 
|-id=440 bgcolor=#E9E9E9
| 282440 ||  || — || December 19, 2003 || Socorro || LINEAR || IAN || align=right | 1.2 km || 
|-id=441 bgcolor=#fefefe
| 282441 ||  || — || December 19, 2003 || Kitt Peak || Spacewatch || MAS || align=right data-sort-value="0.83" | 830 m || 
|-id=442 bgcolor=#fefefe
| 282442 ||  || — || December 19, 2003 || Socorro || LINEAR || ERI || align=right | 2.1 km || 
|-id=443 bgcolor=#FA8072
| 282443 ||  || — || December 20, 2003 || Socorro || LINEAR || — || align=right | 1.5 km || 
|-id=444 bgcolor=#d6d6d6
| 282444 ||  || — || December 19, 2003 || Socorro || LINEAR || EUP || align=right | 5.5 km || 
|-id=445 bgcolor=#fefefe
| 282445 ||  || — || December 19, 2003 || Socorro || LINEAR || — || align=right | 1.1 km || 
|-id=446 bgcolor=#d6d6d6
| 282446 ||  || — || December 29, 2003 || Socorro || LINEAR || EOS || align=right | 2.8 km || 
|-id=447 bgcolor=#d6d6d6
| 282447 ||  || — || January 19, 2004 || Kitt Peak || Spacewatch || TEL || align=right | 1.6 km || 
|-id=448 bgcolor=#d6d6d6
| 282448 ||  || — || January 26, 2004 || Anderson Mesa || LONEOS || URS || align=right | 4.5 km || 
|-id=449 bgcolor=#d6d6d6
| 282449 ||  || — || January 28, 2004 || Kitt Peak || Spacewatch || — || align=right | 4.1 km || 
|-id=450 bgcolor=#E9E9E9
| 282450 ||  || — || January 28, 2004 || Kitt Peak || Spacewatch || — || align=right | 3.5 km || 
|-id=451 bgcolor=#d6d6d6
| 282451 ||  || — || January 18, 2004 || Palomar || NEAT || — || align=right | 2.9 km || 
|-id=452 bgcolor=#d6d6d6
| 282452 ||  || — || February 10, 2004 || Palomar || NEAT || — || align=right | 4.8 km || 
|-id=453 bgcolor=#d6d6d6
| 282453 ||  || — || February 12, 2004 || Kitt Peak || Spacewatch || — || align=right | 2.6 km || 
|-id=454 bgcolor=#fefefe
| 282454 ||  || — || February 14, 2004 || Kitt Peak || Spacewatch || FLO || align=right data-sort-value="0.72" | 720 m || 
|-id=455 bgcolor=#fefefe
| 282455 ||  || — || February 15, 2004 || Haleakala || NEAT || V || align=right | 1.0 km || 
|-id=456 bgcolor=#d6d6d6
| 282456 ||  || — || February 10, 2004 || Palomar || NEAT || — || align=right | 4.7 km || 
|-id=457 bgcolor=#d6d6d6
| 282457 ||  || — || February 11, 2004 || Kitt Peak || Spacewatch || — || align=right | 3.0 km || 
|-id=458 bgcolor=#d6d6d6
| 282458 ||  || — || February 15, 2004 || Socorro || LINEAR || — || align=right | 3.4 km || 
|-id=459 bgcolor=#d6d6d6
| 282459 ||  || — || February 13, 2004 || Anderson Mesa || LONEOS || EOS || align=right | 2.8 km || 
|-id=460 bgcolor=#d6d6d6
| 282460 ||  || — || February 16, 2004 || Kitt Peak || Spacewatch || — || align=right | 3.4 km || 
|-id=461 bgcolor=#fefefe
| 282461 ||  || — || February 18, 2004 || Socorro || LINEAR || FLO || align=right | 1.0 km || 
|-id=462 bgcolor=#d6d6d6
| 282462 ||  || — || February 19, 2004 || Socorro || LINEAR || — || align=right | 4.8 km || 
|-id=463 bgcolor=#fefefe
| 282463 ||  || — || March 15, 2004 || Palomar || NEAT || — || align=right data-sort-value="0.98" | 980 m || 
|-id=464 bgcolor=#fefefe
| 282464 || 2004 FY || — || March 16, 2004 || Goodricke-Pigott || Goodricke-Pigott Obs. || — || align=right | 1.2 km || 
|-id=465 bgcolor=#fefefe
| 282465 ||  || — || March 16, 2004 || Catalina || CSS || — || align=right | 1.4 km || 
|-id=466 bgcolor=#E9E9E9
| 282466 ||  || — || March 20, 2004 || Siding Spring || SSS || — || align=right | 3.5 km || 
|-id=467 bgcolor=#fefefe
| 282467 ||  || — || March 16, 2004 || Kitt Peak || Spacewatch || — || align=right | 1.1 km || 
|-id=468 bgcolor=#fefefe
| 282468 ||  || — || March 19, 2004 || Socorro || LINEAR || — || align=right data-sort-value="0.81" | 810 m || 
|-id=469 bgcolor=#fefefe
| 282469 ||  || — || March 27, 2004 || Socorro || LINEAR || ERI || align=right | 1.8 km || 
|-id=470 bgcolor=#FA8072
| 282470 ||  || — || March 28, 2004 || Socorro || LINEAR || — || align=right data-sort-value="0.80" | 800 m || 
|-id=471 bgcolor=#fefefe
| 282471 ||  || — || April 11, 2004 || Palomar || NEAT || FLO || align=right data-sort-value="0.97" | 970 m || 
|-id=472 bgcolor=#fefefe
| 282472 ||  || — || April 11, 2004 || Palomar || NEAT || — || align=right data-sort-value="0.91" | 910 m || 
|-id=473 bgcolor=#fefefe
| 282473 ||  || — || April 13, 2004 || Catalina || CSS || — || align=right | 1.1 km || 
|-id=474 bgcolor=#fefefe
| 282474 ||  || — || April 9, 2004 || Siding Spring || SSS || — || align=right data-sort-value="0.94" | 940 m || 
|-id=475 bgcolor=#fefefe
| 282475 ||  || — || April 14, 2004 || Haleakala || NEAT || PHO || align=right | 1.4 km || 
|-id=476 bgcolor=#fefefe
| 282476 ||  || — || April 12, 2004 || Kitt Peak || Spacewatch || V || align=right data-sort-value="0.69" | 690 m || 
|-id=477 bgcolor=#fefefe
| 282477 ||  || — || April 27, 2004 || Socorro || LINEAR || — || align=right | 2.8 km || 
|-id=478 bgcolor=#fefefe
| 282478 ||  || — || May 13, 2004 || Socorro || LINEAR || PHO || align=right | 1.1 km || 
|-id=479 bgcolor=#fefefe
| 282479 ||  || — || May 21, 2004 || Socorro || LINEAR || — || align=right data-sort-value="0.93" | 930 m || 
|-id=480 bgcolor=#d6d6d6
| 282480 ||  || — || May 19, 2004 || Kitt Peak || Spacewatch || — || align=right | 4.6 km || 
|-id=481 bgcolor=#fefefe
| 282481 ||  || — || May 22, 2004 || Catalina || CSS || — || align=right | 1.0 km || 
|-id=482 bgcolor=#fefefe
| 282482 ||  || — || June 12, 2004 || Siding Spring || SSS || PHO || align=right | 1.7 km || 
|-id=483 bgcolor=#fefefe
| 282483 ||  || — || June 19, 2004 || Catalina || CSS || — || align=right | 1.2 km || 
|-id=484 bgcolor=#fefefe
| 282484 ||  || — || July 10, 2004 || Catalina || CSS || PHO || align=right | 1.7 km || 
|-id=485 bgcolor=#fefefe
| 282485 ||  || — || July 11, 2004 || Socorro || LINEAR || FLO || align=right data-sort-value="0.89" | 890 m || 
|-id=486 bgcolor=#fefefe
| 282486 ||  || — || July 14, 2004 || Socorro || LINEAR || V || align=right | 1.0 km || 
|-id=487 bgcolor=#fefefe
| 282487 ||  || — || July 14, 2004 || Socorro || LINEAR || — || align=right data-sort-value="0.98" | 980 m || 
|-id=488 bgcolor=#fefefe
| 282488 ||  || — || July 11, 2004 || Socorro || LINEAR || ERI || align=right | 2.1 km || 
|-id=489 bgcolor=#E9E9E9
| 282489 ||  || — || July 16, 2004 || Socorro || LINEAR || — || align=right | 2.8 km || 
|-id=490 bgcolor=#fefefe
| 282490 ||  || — || August 6, 2004 || Palomar || NEAT || — || align=right | 1.0 km || 
|-id=491 bgcolor=#fefefe
| 282491 ||  || — || August 6, 2004 || Palomar || NEAT || NYS || align=right data-sort-value="0.90" | 900 m || 
|-id=492 bgcolor=#d6d6d6
| 282492 ||  || — || August 7, 2004 || Palomar || NEAT || — || align=right | 4.2 km || 
|-id=493 bgcolor=#fefefe
| 282493 ||  || — || August 7, 2004 || Palomar || NEAT || — || align=right | 1.4 km || 
|-id=494 bgcolor=#fefefe
| 282494 ||  || — || August 8, 2004 || Siding Spring || SSS || H || align=right data-sort-value="0.94" | 940 m || 
|-id=495 bgcolor=#fefefe
| 282495 ||  || — || August 8, 2004 || Anderson Mesa || LONEOS || — || align=right data-sort-value="0.98" | 980 m || 
|-id=496 bgcolor=#fefefe
| 282496 ||  || — || August 9, 2004 || Socorro || LINEAR || — || align=right | 1.1 km || 
|-id=497 bgcolor=#d6d6d6
| 282497 ||  || — || August 5, 2004 || Palomar || NEAT || THB || align=right | 3.4 km || 
|-id=498 bgcolor=#fefefe
| 282498 ||  || — || August 8, 2004 || Anderson Mesa || LONEOS || — || align=right data-sort-value="0.96" | 960 m || 
|-id=499 bgcolor=#fefefe
| 282499 ||  || — || August 8, 2004 || Palomar || NEAT || — || align=right | 2.9 km || 
|-id=500 bgcolor=#fefefe
| 282500 ||  || — || August 10, 2004 || Campo Imperatore || CINEOS || NYS || align=right data-sort-value="0.87" | 870 m || 
|}

282501–282600 

|-bgcolor=#d6d6d6
| 282501 ||  || — || August 10, 2004 || Socorro || LINEAR || — || align=right | 3.0 km || 
|-id=502 bgcolor=#fefefe
| 282502 ||  || — || August 10, 2004 || Socorro || LINEAR || — || align=right | 1.2 km || 
|-id=503 bgcolor=#fefefe
| 282503 ||  || — || August 10, 2004 || Socorro || LINEAR || — || align=right | 1.2 km || 
|-id=504 bgcolor=#fefefe
| 282504 ||  || — || August 11, 2004 || Socorro || LINEAR || V || align=right data-sort-value="0.99" | 990 m || 
|-id=505 bgcolor=#fefefe
| 282505 ||  || — || August 11, 2004 || Socorro || LINEAR || NYS || align=right | 1.2 km || 
|-id=506 bgcolor=#d6d6d6
| 282506 ||  || — || August 11, 2004 || Siding Spring || SSS || — || align=right | 3.4 km || 
|-id=507 bgcolor=#fefefe
| 282507 ||  || — || August 12, 2004 || Socorro || LINEAR || — || align=right | 1.1 km || 
|-id=508 bgcolor=#fefefe
| 282508 ||  || — || August 15, 2004 || Palomar || NEAT || V || align=right data-sort-value="0.81" | 810 m || 
|-id=509 bgcolor=#E9E9E9
| 282509 ||  || — || August 9, 2004 || Socorro || LINEAR || — || align=right | 1.7 km || 
|-id=510 bgcolor=#fefefe
| 282510 ||  || — || August 21, 2004 || Siding Spring || SSS || — || align=right | 1.2 km || 
|-id=511 bgcolor=#FA8072
| 282511 ||  || — || August 25, 2004 || Socorro || LINEAR || — || align=right | 1.5 km || 
|-id=512 bgcolor=#d6d6d6
| 282512 ||  || — || August 20, 2004 || Kitt Peak || Spacewatch || HYG || align=right | 2.6 km || 
|-id=513 bgcolor=#fefefe
| 282513 ||  || — || September 6, 2004 || Palomar || NEAT || — || align=right | 1.1 km || 
|-id=514 bgcolor=#fefefe
| 282514 ||  || — || September 8, 2004 || Socorro || LINEAR || MAS || align=right data-sort-value="0.80" | 800 m || 
|-id=515 bgcolor=#fefefe
| 282515 ||  || — || September 8, 2004 || Socorro || LINEAR || — || align=right | 1.2 km || 
|-id=516 bgcolor=#fefefe
| 282516 ||  || — || September 8, 2004 || Socorro || LINEAR || NYS || align=right data-sort-value="0.79" | 790 m || 
|-id=517 bgcolor=#fefefe
| 282517 ||  || — || September 8, 2004 || Socorro || LINEAR || ERI || align=right | 2.4 km || 
|-id=518 bgcolor=#fefefe
| 282518 ||  || — || September 8, 2004 || Socorro || LINEAR || — || align=right | 1.1 km || 
|-id=519 bgcolor=#fefefe
| 282519 ||  || — || September 8, 2004 || Socorro || LINEAR || MAS || align=right | 1.0 km || 
|-id=520 bgcolor=#FA8072
| 282520 ||  || — || September 7, 2004 || Socorro || LINEAR || — || align=right | 1.4 km || 
|-id=521 bgcolor=#fefefe
| 282521 ||  || — || September 6, 2004 || Siding Spring || SSS || V || align=right data-sort-value="0.74" | 740 m || 
|-id=522 bgcolor=#fefefe
| 282522 ||  || — || September 8, 2004 || Socorro || LINEAR || — || align=right | 1.1 km || 
|-id=523 bgcolor=#fefefe
| 282523 ||  || — || September 8, 2004 || Palomar || NEAT || FLO || align=right data-sort-value="0.91" | 910 m || 
|-id=524 bgcolor=#fefefe
| 282524 ||  || — || September 10, 2004 || Socorro || LINEAR || FLO || align=right data-sort-value="0.90" | 900 m || 
|-id=525 bgcolor=#fefefe
| 282525 ||  || — || September 8, 2004 || Socorro || LINEAR || NYS || align=right data-sort-value="0.71" | 710 m || 
|-id=526 bgcolor=#fefefe
| 282526 ||  || — || September 10, 2004 || Socorro || LINEAR || — || align=right | 1.1 km || 
|-id=527 bgcolor=#fefefe
| 282527 ||  || — || September 10, 2004 || Socorro || LINEAR || V || align=right | 1.1 km || 
|-id=528 bgcolor=#fefefe
| 282528 ||  || — || September 10, 2004 || Socorro || LINEAR || FLO || align=right | 1.2 km || 
|-id=529 bgcolor=#fefefe
| 282529 ||  || — || September 10, 2004 || Socorro || LINEAR || FLO || align=right | 1.2 km || 
|-id=530 bgcolor=#fefefe
| 282530 ||  || — || September 12, 2004 || Palomar || NEAT || PHO || align=right | 2.2 km || 
|-id=531 bgcolor=#FA8072
| 282531 ||  || — || September 11, 2004 || Socorro || LINEAR || — || align=right | 1.2 km || 
|-id=532 bgcolor=#fefefe
| 282532 ||  || — || September 8, 2004 || Palomar || NEAT || — || align=right | 1.1 km || 
|-id=533 bgcolor=#fefefe
| 282533 ||  || — || September 10, 2004 || Kitt Peak || Spacewatch || — || align=right data-sort-value="0.75" | 750 m || 
|-id=534 bgcolor=#fefefe
| 282534 ||  || — || September 12, 2004 || Socorro || LINEAR || — || align=right | 1.4 km || 
|-id=535 bgcolor=#fefefe
| 282535 ||  || — || September 9, 2004 || Socorro || LINEAR || NYS || align=right data-sort-value="0.78" | 780 m || 
|-id=536 bgcolor=#fefefe
| 282536 ||  || — || September 10, 2004 || Kitt Peak || Spacewatch || V || align=right data-sort-value="0.83" | 830 m || 
|-id=537 bgcolor=#fefefe
| 282537 ||  || — || September 13, 2004 || Kitt Peak || Spacewatch || — || align=right data-sort-value="0.97" | 970 m || 
|-id=538 bgcolor=#fefefe
| 282538 ||  || — || September 9, 2004 || Socorro || LINEAR || — || align=right data-sort-value="0.83" | 830 m || 
|-id=539 bgcolor=#d6d6d6
| 282539 ||  || — || September 8, 2004 || Bergisch Gladbach || W. Bickel || — || align=right | 4.3 km || 
|-id=540 bgcolor=#fefefe
| 282540 ||  || — || September 13, 2004 || Socorro || LINEAR || ERI || align=right | 1.8 km || 
|-id=541 bgcolor=#fefefe
| 282541 ||  || — || September 17, 2004 || Socorro || LINEAR || FLO || align=right data-sort-value="0.74" | 740 m || 
|-id=542 bgcolor=#fefefe
| 282542 ||  || — || September 17, 2004 || Socorro || LINEAR || — || align=right | 1.1 km || 
|-id=543 bgcolor=#E9E9E9
| 282543 ||  || — || September 21, 2004 || Anderson Mesa || LONEOS || EUN || align=right | 1.8 km || 
|-id=544 bgcolor=#E9E9E9
| 282544 ||  || — || October 4, 2004 || Kitt Peak || Spacewatch || — || align=right | 1.7 km || 
|-id=545 bgcolor=#E9E9E9
| 282545 ||  || — || October 5, 2004 || Anderson Mesa || LONEOS || — || align=right | 2.6 km || 
|-id=546 bgcolor=#fefefe
| 282546 ||  || — || October 7, 2004 || Anderson Mesa || LONEOS || V || align=right data-sort-value="0.94" | 940 m || 
|-id=547 bgcolor=#fefefe
| 282547 ||  || — || October 7, 2004 || Anderson Mesa || LONEOS || EUT || align=right data-sort-value="0.86" | 860 m || 
|-id=548 bgcolor=#fefefe
| 282548 ||  || — || October 6, 2004 || Kitt Peak || Spacewatch || NYS || align=right data-sort-value="0.72" | 720 m || 
|-id=549 bgcolor=#fefefe
| 282549 ||  || — || October 7, 2004 || Kitt Peak || Spacewatch || — || align=right data-sort-value="0.97" | 970 m || 
|-id=550 bgcolor=#E9E9E9
| 282550 ||  || — || October 7, 2004 || Kitt Peak || Spacewatch || — || align=right | 2.8 km || 
|-id=551 bgcolor=#d6d6d6
| 282551 ||  || — || October 10, 2004 || Kitt Peak || Spacewatch || HYG || align=right | 2.8 km || 
|-id=552 bgcolor=#fefefe
| 282552 ||  || — || October 4, 2004 || Palomar || NEAT || V || align=right data-sort-value="0.85" | 850 m || 
|-id=553 bgcolor=#E9E9E9
| 282553 ||  || — || October 15, 2004 || Kitt Peak || Spacewatch || — || align=right | 1.8 km || 
|-id=554 bgcolor=#E9E9E9
| 282554 ||  || — || October 13, 2004 || Anderson Mesa || LONEOS || GER || align=right | 2.0 km || 
|-id=555 bgcolor=#fefefe
| 282555 ||  || — || October 14, 2004 || Anderson Mesa || LONEOS || — || align=right | 1.4 km || 
|-id=556 bgcolor=#fefefe
| 282556 ||  || — || October 16, 2004 || Socorro || LINEAR || — || align=right | 1.2 km || 
|-id=557 bgcolor=#E9E9E9
| 282557 ||  || — || November 3, 2004 || Palomar || NEAT || — || align=right | 1.9 km || 
|-id=558 bgcolor=#E9E9E9
| 282558 ||  || — || November 7, 2004 || Socorro || LINEAR || — || align=right | 3.9 km || 
|-id=559 bgcolor=#fefefe
| 282559 ||  || — || November 19, 2004 || Socorro || LINEAR || — || align=right data-sort-value="0.92" | 920 m || 
|-id=560 bgcolor=#fefefe
| 282560 ||  || — || December 9, 2004 || Jarnac || Jarnac Obs. || H || align=right | 1.1 km || 
|-id=561 bgcolor=#E9E9E9
| 282561 ||  || — || December 2, 2004 || Socorro || LINEAR || — || align=right | 5.1 km || 
|-id=562 bgcolor=#E9E9E9
| 282562 ||  || — || December 3, 2004 || Kitt Peak || Spacewatch || GEF || align=right | 1.8 km || 
|-id=563 bgcolor=#E9E9E9
| 282563 ||  || — || December 7, 2004 || Socorro || LINEAR || — || align=right | 1.5 km || 
|-id=564 bgcolor=#E9E9E9
| 282564 ||  || — || December 10, 2004 || Anderson Mesa || LONEOS || — || align=right | 1.7 km || 
|-id=565 bgcolor=#E9E9E9
| 282565 ||  || — || December 10, 2004 || Socorro || LINEAR || — || align=right | 2.0 km || 
|-id=566 bgcolor=#E9E9E9
| 282566 ||  || — || December 11, 2004 || Kitt Peak || Spacewatch || — || align=right | 2.8 km || 
|-id=567 bgcolor=#E9E9E9
| 282567 ||  || — || December 11, 2004 || Kitt Peak || Spacewatch || AER || align=right | 1.7 km || 
|-id=568 bgcolor=#E9E9E9
| 282568 ||  || — || December 18, 2004 || Mount Lemmon || Mount Lemmon Survey || — || align=right | 2.6 km || 
|-id=569 bgcolor=#E9E9E9
| 282569 ||  || — || December 16, 2004 || Kitt Peak || Spacewatch || — || align=right | 2.1 km || 
|-id=570 bgcolor=#fefefe
| 282570 ||  || — || January 15, 2005 || Socorro || LINEAR || H || align=right data-sort-value="0.84" | 840 m || 
|-id=571 bgcolor=#E9E9E9
| 282571 ||  || — || January 13, 2005 || Socorro || LINEAR || — || align=right | 2.7 km || 
|-id=572 bgcolor=#E9E9E9
| 282572 ||  || — || January 13, 2005 || Catalina || CSS || EUN || align=right | 1.7 km || 
|-id=573 bgcolor=#E9E9E9
| 282573 ||  || — || January 15, 2005 || Socorro || LINEAR || — || align=right | 2.6 km || 
|-id=574 bgcolor=#E9E9E9
| 282574 ||  || — || January 15, 2005 || Socorro || LINEAR || — || align=right | 1.7 km || 
|-id=575 bgcolor=#E9E9E9
| 282575 ||  || — || January 15, 2005 || Socorro || LINEAR || HOF || align=right | 3.5 km || 
|-id=576 bgcolor=#fefefe
| 282576 ||  || — || January 15, 2005 || Socorro || LINEAR || — || align=right data-sort-value="0.92" | 920 m || 
|-id=577 bgcolor=#E9E9E9
| 282577 ||  || — || February 1, 2005 || Catalina || CSS || — || align=right | 2.2 km || 
|-id=578 bgcolor=#FA8072
| 282578 ||  || — || February 1, 2005 || Kitt Peak || Spacewatch || H || align=right | 1.1 km || 
|-id=579 bgcolor=#E9E9E9
| 282579 ||  || — || February 2, 2005 || Kitt Peak || Spacewatch || — || align=right | 4.1 km || 
|-id=580 bgcolor=#d6d6d6
| 282580 ||  || — || February 2, 2005 || Catalina || CSS || — || align=right | 3.1 km || 
|-id=581 bgcolor=#fefefe
| 282581 ||  || — || February 9, 2005 || Socorro || LINEAR || H || align=right data-sort-value="0.74" | 740 m || 
|-id=582 bgcolor=#d6d6d6
| 282582 ||  || — || March 3, 2005 || Catalina || CSS || — || align=right | 3.5 km || 
|-id=583 bgcolor=#d6d6d6
| 282583 ||  || — || March 9, 2005 || Mount Lemmon || Mount Lemmon Survey || — || align=right | 3.1 km || 
|-id=584 bgcolor=#d6d6d6
| 282584 ||  || — || March 10, 2005 || Mount Lemmon || Mount Lemmon Survey || — || align=right | 3.0 km || 
|-id=585 bgcolor=#d6d6d6
| 282585 ||  || — || March 10, 2005 || Mount Lemmon || Mount Lemmon Survey || EOS || align=right | 2.0 km || 
|-id=586 bgcolor=#d6d6d6
| 282586 ||  || — || March 7, 2005 || Socorro || LINEAR || — || align=right | 3.3 km || 
|-id=587 bgcolor=#d6d6d6
| 282587 ||  || — || March 8, 2005 || Kitt Peak || Spacewatch || — || align=right | 3.8 km || 
|-id=588 bgcolor=#E9E9E9
| 282588 ||  || — || March 8, 2005 || Socorro || LINEAR || NEM || align=right | 3.0 km || 
|-id=589 bgcolor=#E9E9E9
| 282589 ||  || — || March 11, 2005 || Kitt Peak || Spacewatch || — || align=right | 2.9 km || 
|-id=590 bgcolor=#d6d6d6
| 282590 ||  || — || March 9, 2005 || Mount Lemmon || Mount Lemmon Survey || — || align=right | 4.3 km || 
|-id=591 bgcolor=#d6d6d6
| 282591 ||  || — || March 10, 2005 || Mount Lemmon || Mount Lemmon Survey || — || align=right | 3.4 km || 
|-id=592 bgcolor=#d6d6d6
| 282592 ||  || — || March 10, 2005 || Mount Lemmon || Mount Lemmon Survey || — || align=right | 3.3 km || 
|-id=593 bgcolor=#d6d6d6
| 282593 ||  || — || March 13, 2005 || Kitt Peak || Spacewatch || — || align=right | 3.0 km || 
|-id=594 bgcolor=#d6d6d6
| 282594 ||  || — || March 8, 2005 || Anderson Mesa || LONEOS || KOR || align=right | 2.1 km || 
|-id=595 bgcolor=#d6d6d6
| 282595 ||  || — || March 16, 2005 || Mount Lemmon || Mount Lemmon Survey || — || align=right | 3.2 km || 
|-id=596 bgcolor=#d6d6d6
| 282596 ||  || — || March 31, 2005 || Anderson Mesa || LONEOS || EOS || align=right | 2.8 km || 
|-id=597 bgcolor=#d6d6d6
| 282597 ||  || — || April 4, 2005 || Catalina || CSS || — || align=right | 3.1 km || 
|-id=598 bgcolor=#d6d6d6
| 282598 ||  || — || April 5, 2005 || Mount Lemmon || Mount Lemmon Survey || EOS || align=right | 2.4 km || 
|-id=599 bgcolor=#d6d6d6
| 282599 ||  || — || April 6, 2005 || Mount Lemmon || Mount Lemmon Survey || — || align=right | 3.3 km || 
|-id=600 bgcolor=#d6d6d6
| 282600 ||  || — || April 4, 2005 || Mount Lemmon || Mount Lemmon Survey || BRA || align=right | 2.1 km || 
|}

282601–282700 

|-bgcolor=#d6d6d6
| 282601 ||  || — || April 6, 2005 || Catalina || CSS || THB || align=right | 3.8 km || 
|-id=602 bgcolor=#d6d6d6
| 282602 ||  || — || April 10, 2005 || Mount Lemmon || Mount Lemmon Survey || — || align=right | 3.8 km || 
|-id=603 bgcolor=#d6d6d6
| 282603 ||  || — || April 8, 2005 || Socorro || LINEAR || TIR || align=right | 3.4 km || 
|-id=604 bgcolor=#d6d6d6
| 282604 ||  || — || April 12, 2005 || Mount Lemmon || Mount Lemmon Survey || — || align=right | 3.6 km || 
|-id=605 bgcolor=#d6d6d6
| 282605 ||  || — || April 13, 2005 || Anderson Mesa || LONEOS || — || align=right | 5.2 km || 
|-id=606 bgcolor=#d6d6d6
| 282606 ||  || — || April 10, 2005 || Mount Lemmon || Mount Lemmon Survey || — || align=right | 5.2 km || 
|-id=607 bgcolor=#d6d6d6
| 282607 ||  || — || April 10, 2005 || Mount Lemmon || Mount Lemmon Survey || — || align=right | 3.5 km || 
|-id=608 bgcolor=#d6d6d6
| 282608 ||  || — || April 15, 2005 || Kitt Peak || Spacewatch || — || align=right | 3.1 km || 
|-id=609 bgcolor=#d6d6d6
| 282609 ||  || — || May 3, 2005 || Kitt Peak || Spacewatch || — || align=right | 4.0 km || 
|-id=610 bgcolor=#d6d6d6
| 282610 ||  || — || May 4, 2005 || Catalina || CSS || — || align=right | 2.6 km || 
|-id=611 bgcolor=#d6d6d6
| 282611 ||  || — || May 3, 2005 || Kitt Peak || Spacewatch || VER || align=right | 3.2 km || 
|-id=612 bgcolor=#d6d6d6
| 282612 ||  || — || May 4, 2005 || Palomar || NEAT || EUP || align=right | 4.1 km || 
|-id=613 bgcolor=#d6d6d6
| 282613 ||  || — || May 4, 2005 || Catalina || CSS || — || align=right | 4.0 km || 
|-id=614 bgcolor=#d6d6d6
| 282614 ||  || — || May 6, 2005 || Mount Lemmon || Mount Lemmon Survey || — || align=right | 3.1 km || 
|-id=615 bgcolor=#d6d6d6
| 282615 ||  || — || May 7, 2005 || Mount Lemmon || Mount Lemmon Survey || TIR || align=right | 4.6 km || 
|-id=616 bgcolor=#d6d6d6
| 282616 ||  || — || May 4, 2005 || Kitt Peak || Spacewatch || HYG || align=right | 3.3 km || 
|-id=617 bgcolor=#d6d6d6
| 282617 ||  || — || May 9, 2005 || Kitt Peak || Spacewatch || — || align=right | 3.6 km || 
|-id=618 bgcolor=#d6d6d6
| 282618 ||  || — || May 9, 2005 || Kitt Peak || Spacewatch || — || align=right | 3.3 km || 
|-id=619 bgcolor=#d6d6d6
| 282619 ||  || — || May 9, 2005 || Kitt Peak || Spacewatch || — || align=right | 3.5 km || 
|-id=620 bgcolor=#d6d6d6
| 282620 ||  || — || May 14, 2005 || Mount Lemmon || Mount Lemmon Survey || — || align=right | 4.2 km || 
|-id=621 bgcolor=#d6d6d6
| 282621 ||  || — || May 4, 2005 || Kitt Peak || Spacewatch || THB || align=right | 4.8 km || 
|-id=622 bgcolor=#d6d6d6
| 282622 ||  || — || May 19, 2005 || Palomar || NEAT || URS || align=right | 4.0 km || 
|-id=623 bgcolor=#d6d6d6
| 282623 ||  || — || June 8, 2005 || Kitt Peak || Spacewatch || — || align=right | 3.9 km || 
|-id=624 bgcolor=#fefefe
| 282624 ||  || — || June 4, 2005 || Kitt Peak || Spacewatch || — || align=right | 1.1 km || 
|-id=625 bgcolor=#d6d6d6
| 282625 ||  || — || June 9, 2005 || Kitt Peak || Spacewatch || — || align=right | 4.3 km || 
|-id=626 bgcolor=#d6d6d6
| 282626 ||  || — || June 17, 2005 || Kitt Peak || Spacewatch || — || align=right | 3.7 km || 
|-id=627 bgcolor=#E9E9E9
| 282627 ||  || — || August 10, 2005 || Cerro Tololo || M. W. Buie || — || align=right | 1.5 km || 
|-id=628 bgcolor=#E9E9E9
| 282628 ||  || — || August 27, 2005 || Palomar || NEAT || HOF || align=right | 2.8 km || 
|-id=629 bgcolor=#fefefe
| 282629 ||  || — || August 27, 2005 || Palomar || NEAT || — || align=right data-sort-value="0.66" | 660 m || 
|-id=630 bgcolor=#d6d6d6
| 282630 ||  || — || September 3, 2005 || Mauna Kea || P. A. Wiegert || — || align=right | 4.7 km || 
|-id=631 bgcolor=#d6d6d6
| 282631 ||  || — || September 23, 2005 || Ondřejov || P. Kušnirák || EOS || align=right | 2.8 km || 
|-id=632 bgcolor=#fefefe
| 282632 ||  || — || September 23, 2005 || Kitt Peak || Spacewatch || FLO || align=right data-sort-value="0.77" | 770 m || 
|-id=633 bgcolor=#E9E9E9
| 282633 ||  || — || September 30, 2005 || Kitt Peak || Spacewatch || EUN || align=right | 1.5 km || 
|-id=634 bgcolor=#fefefe
| 282634 ||  || — || September 23, 2005 || Kitt Peak || Spacewatch || — || align=right | 1.1 km || 
|-id=635 bgcolor=#E9E9E9
| 282635 ||  || — || September 29, 2005 || Kitt Peak || Spacewatch || — || align=right | 1.8 km || 
|-id=636 bgcolor=#E9E9E9
| 282636 ||  || — || September 23, 2005 || Anderson Mesa || LONEOS || — || align=right | 3.0 km || 
|-id=637 bgcolor=#E9E9E9
| 282637 ||  || — || October 1, 2005 || Catalina || CSS || GEF || align=right | 1.8 km || 
|-id=638 bgcolor=#d6d6d6
| 282638 ||  || — || October 1, 2005 || Catalina || CSS || — || align=right | 2.8 km || 
|-id=639 bgcolor=#FA8072
| 282639 ||  || — || October 9, 2005 || Ottmarsheim || Ottmarsheim Obs. || — || align=right data-sort-value="0.91" | 910 m || 
|-id=640 bgcolor=#fefefe
| 282640 ||  || — || October 4, 2005 || Mount Lemmon || Mount Lemmon Survey || — || align=right data-sort-value="0.92" | 920 m || 
|-id=641 bgcolor=#d6d6d6
| 282641 ||  || — || October 7, 2005 || Anderson Mesa || LONEOS || — || align=right | 3.6 km || 
|-id=642 bgcolor=#fefefe
| 282642 ||  || — || October 7, 2005 || Socorro || LINEAR || — || align=right | 1.9 km || 
|-id=643 bgcolor=#E9E9E9
| 282643 ||  || — || October 8, 2005 || Catalina || CSS || KRM || align=right | 3.1 km || 
|-id=644 bgcolor=#d6d6d6
| 282644 ||  || — || October 7, 2005 || Catalina || CSS || — || align=right | 4.7 km || 
|-id=645 bgcolor=#fefefe
| 282645 ||  || — || October 10, 2005 || Kitt Peak || Spacewatch || H || align=right data-sort-value="0.78" | 780 m || 
|-id=646 bgcolor=#d6d6d6
| 282646 ||  || — || October 22, 2005 || Kitt Peak || Spacewatch || — || align=right | 4.8 km || 
|-id=647 bgcolor=#fefefe
| 282647 ||  || — || October 23, 2005 || Catalina || CSS || — || align=right data-sort-value="0.99" | 990 m || 
|-id=648 bgcolor=#fefefe
| 282648 ||  || — || October 25, 2005 || Catalina || CSS || — || align=right data-sort-value="0.97" | 970 m || 
|-id=649 bgcolor=#fefefe
| 282649 ||  || — || October 22, 2005 || Kitt Peak || Spacewatch || — || align=right data-sort-value="0.76" | 760 m || 
|-id=650 bgcolor=#fefefe
| 282650 ||  || — || October 22, 2005 || Kitt Peak || Spacewatch || — || align=right | 1.2 km || 
|-id=651 bgcolor=#fefefe
| 282651 ||  || — || October 22, 2005 || Kitt Peak || Spacewatch || — || align=right | 1.0 km || 
|-id=652 bgcolor=#d6d6d6
| 282652 ||  || — || October 22, 2005 || Kitt Peak || Spacewatch || CHA || align=right | 3.0 km || 
|-id=653 bgcolor=#fefefe
| 282653 ||  || — || October 25, 2005 || Catalina || CSS || — || align=right data-sort-value="0.83" | 830 m || 
|-id=654 bgcolor=#FA8072
| 282654 ||  || — || October 26, 2005 || Catalina || CSS || — || align=right | 2.0 km || 
|-id=655 bgcolor=#fefefe
| 282655 ||  || — || October 24, 2005 || Kitt Peak || Spacewatch || — || align=right data-sort-value="0.97" | 970 m || 
|-id=656 bgcolor=#fefefe
| 282656 ||  || — || October 25, 2005 || Mount Lemmon || Mount Lemmon Survey || FLO || align=right data-sort-value="0.75" | 750 m || 
|-id=657 bgcolor=#fefefe
| 282657 ||  || — || October 29, 2005 || Catalina || CSS || FLO || align=right data-sort-value="0.86" | 860 m || 
|-id=658 bgcolor=#fefefe
| 282658 ||  || — || October 30, 2005 || Kitt Peak || Spacewatch || NYS || align=right data-sort-value="0.91" | 910 m || 
|-id=659 bgcolor=#fefefe
| 282659 ||  || — || October 29, 2005 || Catalina || CSS || FLO || align=right data-sort-value="0.85" | 850 m || 
|-id=660 bgcolor=#E9E9E9
| 282660 ||  || — || October 29, 2005 || Catalina || CSS || — || align=right | 2.4 km || 
|-id=661 bgcolor=#fefefe
| 282661 ||  || — || October 27, 2005 || Anderson Mesa || LONEOS || V || align=right data-sort-value="0.80" | 800 m || 
|-id=662 bgcolor=#E9E9E9
| 282662 ||  || — || October 31, 2005 || Catalina || CSS || — || align=right | 3.6 km || 
|-id=663 bgcolor=#fefefe
| 282663 ||  || — || October 29, 2005 || Mount Lemmon || Mount Lemmon Survey || — || align=right data-sort-value="0.75" | 750 m || 
|-id=664 bgcolor=#fefefe
| 282664 ||  || — || October 30, 2005 || Mount Lemmon || Mount Lemmon Survey || — || align=right data-sort-value="0.98" | 980 m || 
|-id=665 bgcolor=#d6d6d6
| 282665 ||  || — || October 30, 2005 || Kitt Peak || Spacewatch || — || align=right | 4.5 km || 
|-id=666 bgcolor=#d6d6d6
| 282666 ||  || — || October 29, 2005 || Mount Lemmon || Mount Lemmon Survey || — || align=right | 4.1 km || 
|-id=667 bgcolor=#fefefe
| 282667 ||  || — || October 26, 2005 || Kitt Peak || Spacewatch || — || align=right data-sort-value="0.91" | 910 m || 
|-id=668 bgcolor=#fefefe
| 282668 ||  || — || October 26, 2005 || Apache Point || A. C. Becker || V || align=right data-sort-value="0.57" | 570 m || 
|-id=669 bgcolor=#fefefe
| 282669 Erguël ||  ||  || November 6, 2005 || Nogales || M. Ory || — || align=right data-sort-value="0.91" | 910 m || 
|-id=670 bgcolor=#fefefe
| 282670 ||  || — || November 1, 2005 || Mount Lemmon || Mount Lemmon Survey || — || align=right data-sort-value="0.67" | 670 m || 
|-id=671 bgcolor=#d6d6d6
| 282671 ||  || — || November 6, 2005 || Kitt Peak || Spacewatch || EOS || align=right | 2.7 km || 
|-id=672 bgcolor=#fefefe
| 282672 ||  || — || November 20, 2005 || Palomar || NEAT || FLO || align=right data-sort-value="0.77" | 770 m || 
|-id=673 bgcolor=#fefefe
| 282673 ||  || — || November 21, 2005 || Catalina || CSS || — || align=right | 1.1 km || 
|-id=674 bgcolor=#d6d6d6
| 282674 ||  || — || November 21, 2005 || Kitt Peak || Spacewatch || — || align=right | 4.0 km || 
|-id=675 bgcolor=#d6d6d6
| 282675 ||  || — || November 26, 2005 || Catalina || CSS || — || align=right | 3.2 km || 
|-id=676 bgcolor=#fefefe
| 282676 ||  || — || November 25, 2005 || Mount Lemmon || Mount Lemmon Survey || — || align=right data-sort-value="0.71" | 710 m || 
|-id=677 bgcolor=#d6d6d6
| 282677 ||  || — || November 29, 2005 || Socorro || LINEAR || — || align=right | 3.7 km || 
|-id=678 bgcolor=#d6d6d6
| 282678 ||  || — || November 30, 2005 || Kitt Peak || Spacewatch || — || align=right | 2.4 km || 
|-id=679 bgcolor=#d6d6d6
| 282679 ||  || — || November 28, 2005 || Socorro || LINEAR || — || align=right | 4.6 km || 
|-id=680 bgcolor=#d6d6d6
| 282680 ||  || — || November 21, 2005 || Anderson Mesa || LONEOS || EOS || align=right | 2.7 km || 
|-id=681 bgcolor=#d6d6d6
| 282681 ||  || — || November 21, 2005 || Catalina || CSS || EOS || align=right | 2.7 km || 
|-id=682 bgcolor=#fefefe
| 282682 ||  || — || November 22, 2005 || Needville || Needville Obs. || — || align=right | 1.0 km || 
|-id=683 bgcolor=#fefefe
| 282683 ||  || — || December 1, 2005 || Kitt Peak || Spacewatch || — || align=right data-sort-value="0.98" | 980 m || 
|-id=684 bgcolor=#E9E9E9
| 282684 ||  || — || December 1, 2005 || Socorro || LINEAR || — || align=right | 1.6 km || 
|-id=685 bgcolor=#fefefe
| 282685 ||  || — || December 2, 2005 || Socorro || LINEAR || — || align=right | 1.3 km || 
|-id=686 bgcolor=#d6d6d6
| 282686 ||  || — || December 1, 2005 || Socorro || LINEAR || — || align=right | 2.5 km || 
|-id=687 bgcolor=#E9E9E9
| 282687 ||  || — || December 22, 2005 || Kitt Peak || Spacewatch || — || align=right | 1.3 km || 
|-id=688 bgcolor=#d6d6d6
| 282688 ||  || — || December 22, 2005 || Kitt Peak || Spacewatch || EOS || align=right | 2.2 km || 
|-id=689 bgcolor=#fefefe
| 282689 ||  || — || December 22, 2005 || Kitt Peak || Spacewatch || — || align=right | 1.1 km || 
|-id=690 bgcolor=#fefefe
| 282690 ||  || — || December 26, 2005 || Mount Lemmon || Mount Lemmon Survey || — || align=right | 1.4 km || 
|-id=691 bgcolor=#fefefe
| 282691 ||  || — || December 29, 2005 || Kitt Peak || Spacewatch || V || align=right data-sort-value="0.90" | 900 m || 
|-id=692 bgcolor=#fefefe
| 282692 ||  || — || December 22, 2005 || Kitt Peak || Spacewatch || NYS || align=right data-sort-value="0.87" | 870 m || 
|-id=693 bgcolor=#fefefe
| 282693 ||  || — || December 26, 2005 || Mount Lemmon || Mount Lemmon Survey || — || align=right | 1.4 km || 
|-id=694 bgcolor=#fefefe
| 282694 ||  || — || January 2, 2006 || Catalina || CSS || H || align=right data-sort-value="0.93" | 930 m || 
|-id=695 bgcolor=#d6d6d6
| 282695 ||  || — || January 5, 2006 || Catalina || CSS || — || align=right | 4.1 km || 
|-id=696 bgcolor=#E9E9E9
| 282696 ||  || — || January 5, 2006 || Kitt Peak || Spacewatch || — || align=right | 1.1 km || 
|-id=697 bgcolor=#d6d6d6
| 282697 ||  || — || January 6, 2006 || Anderson Mesa || LONEOS || — || align=right | 3.5 km || 
|-id=698 bgcolor=#E9E9E9
| 282698 ||  || — || January 20, 2006 || Kitt Peak || Spacewatch || — || align=right | 1.2 km || 
|-id=699 bgcolor=#E9E9E9
| 282699 ||  || — || January 23, 2006 || Catalina || CSS || — || align=right | 2.5 km || 
|-id=700 bgcolor=#d6d6d6
| 282700 ||  || — || January 23, 2006 || Catalina || CSS || — || align=right | 4.8 km || 
|}

282701–282800 

|-bgcolor=#d6d6d6
| 282701 ||  || — || January 22, 2006 || Mount Lemmon || Mount Lemmon Survey || — || align=right | 3.4 km || 
|-id=702 bgcolor=#E9E9E9
| 282702 ||  || — || January 23, 2006 || Kitt Peak || Spacewatch || — || align=right | 2.1 km || 
|-id=703 bgcolor=#fefefe
| 282703 ||  || — || January 23, 2006 || Mount Lemmon || Mount Lemmon Survey || NYS || align=right data-sort-value="0.96" | 960 m || 
|-id=704 bgcolor=#E9E9E9
| 282704 ||  || — || January 23, 2006 || Kitt Peak || Spacewatch || GEF || align=right | 1.7 km || 
|-id=705 bgcolor=#E9E9E9
| 282705 ||  || — || January 26, 2006 || Kitt Peak || Spacewatch || — || align=right | 1.5 km || 
|-id=706 bgcolor=#fefefe
| 282706 ||  || — || January 26, 2006 || Mount Lemmon || Mount Lemmon Survey || — || align=right | 1.5 km || 
|-id=707 bgcolor=#E9E9E9
| 282707 ||  || — || January 26, 2006 || Kitt Peak || Spacewatch || — || align=right | 1.5 km || 
|-id=708 bgcolor=#E9E9E9
| 282708 ||  || — || January 26, 2006 || Kitt Peak || Spacewatch || — || align=right | 1.5 km || 
|-id=709 bgcolor=#E9E9E9
| 282709 ||  || — || January 25, 2006 || Kitt Peak || Spacewatch || — || align=right | 1.2 km || 
|-id=710 bgcolor=#d6d6d6
| 282710 ||  || — || January 25, 2006 || Kitt Peak || Spacewatch || — || align=right | 3.3 km || 
|-id=711 bgcolor=#C2FFFF
| 282711 ||  || — || January 30, 2006 || Kitt Peak || Spacewatch || L5 || align=right | 8.6 km || 
|-id=712 bgcolor=#E9E9E9
| 282712 ||  || — || January 30, 2006 || Kitt Peak || Spacewatch || — || align=right | 1.3 km || 
|-id=713 bgcolor=#fefefe
| 282713 ||  || — || January 31, 2006 || Kitt Peak || Spacewatch || V || align=right data-sort-value="0.89" | 890 m || 
|-id=714 bgcolor=#d6d6d6
| 282714 ||  || — || January 31, 2006 || Kitt Peak || Spacewatch || — || align=right | 2.3 km || 
|-id=715 bgcolor=#fefefe
| 282715 ||  || — || January 31, 2006 || Kitt Peak || Spacewatch || — || align=right | 1.1 km || 
|-id=716 bgcolor=#E9E9E9
| 282716 ||  || — || January 31, 2006 || Kitt Peak || Spacewatch || — || align=right | 1.4 km || 
|-id=717 bgcolor=#d6d6d6
| 282717 ||  || — || January 31, 2006 || Kitt Peak || Spacewatch || — || align=right | 3.9 km || 
|-id=718 bgcolor=#fefefe
| 282718 ||  || — || January 31, 2006 || Kitt Peak || Spacewatch || — || align=right | 1.2 km || 
|-id=719 bgcolor=#fefefe
| 282719 ||  || — || January 31, 2006 || Catalina || CSS || — || align=right | 1.1 km || 
|-id=720 bgcolor=#E9E9E9
| 282720 ||  || — || February 2, 2006 || Mount Lemmon || Mount Lemmon Survey || — || align=right | 2.3 km || 
|-id=721 bgcolor=#fefefe
| 282721 ||  || — || February 4, 2006 || Mount Lemmon || Mount Lemmon Survey || — || align=right | 1.1 km || 
|-id=722 bgcolor=#E9E9E9
| 282722 ||  || — || February 20, 2006 || Kitt Peak || Spacewatch || — || align=right | 1.2 km || 
|-id=723 bgcolor=#E9E9E9
| 282723 ||  || — || February 21, 2006 || Mount Lemmon || Mount Lemmon Survey || — || align=right | 1.7 km || 
|-id=724 bgcolor=#E9E9E9
| 282724 ||  || — || February 20, 2006 || Kitt Peak || Spacewatch || — || align=right | 1.6 km || 
|-id=725 bgcolor=#d6d6d6
| 282725 ||  || — || February 24, 2006 || Catalina || CSS || — || align=right | 3.6 km || 
|-id=726 bgcolor=#E9E9E9
| 282726 ||  || — || February 24, 2006 || Mount Lemmon || Mount Lemmon Survey || ADE || align=right | 3.6 km || 
|-id=727 bgcolor=#E9E9E9
| 282727 ||  || — || February 21, 2006 || Mount Lemmon || Mount Lemmon Survey || — || align=right | 2.1 km || 
|-id=728 bgcolor=#E9E9E9
| 282728 ||  || — || February 24, 2006 || Kitt Peak || Spacewatch || — || align=right | 1.5 km || 
|-id=729 bgcolor=#E9E9E9
| 282729 ||  || — || February 24, 2006 || Kitt Peak || Spacewatch || — || align=right | 1.3 km || 
|-id=730 bgcolor=#E9E9E9
| 282730 ||  || — || February 24, 2006 || Kitt Peak || Spacewatch || — || align=right | 1.8 km || 
|-id=731 bgcolor=#E9E9E9
| 282731 ||  || — || February 20, 2006 || Socorro || LINEAR || — || align=right | 2.7 km || 
|-id=732 bgcolor=#E9E9E9
| 282732 ||  || — || February 25, 2006 || Mount Lemmon || Mount Lemmon Survey || ADE || align=right | 2.8 km || 
|-id=733 bgcolor=#E9E9E9
| 282733 ||  || — || February 25, 2006 || Kitt Peak || Spacewatch || — || align=right | 1.4 km || 
|-id=734 bgcolor=#E9E9E9
| 282734 ||  || — || February 21, 2006 || Catalina || CSS || ADE || align=right | 2.9 km || 
|-id=735 bgcolor=#E9E9E9
| 282735 ||  || — || February 26, 2006 || Catalina || CSS || — || align=right | 1.6 km || 
|-id=736 bgcolor=#E9E9E9
| 282736 ||  || — || February 24, 2006 || Catalina || CSS || — || align=right | 2.6 km || 
|-id=737 bgcolor=#E9E9E9
| 282737 ||  || — || February 25, 2006 || Catalina || CSS || — || align=right | 4.0 km || 
|-id=738 bgcolor=#E9E9E9
| 282738 ||  || — || February 25, 2006 || Kitt Peak || Spacewatch || — || align=right | 1.7 km || 
|-id=739 bgcolor=#d6d6d6
| 282739 ||  || — || February 25, 2006 || Catalina || CSS || EUP || align=right | 5.6 km || 
|-id=740 bgcolor=#d6d6d6
| 282740 ||  || — || February 24, 2006 || Kitt Peak || Spacewatch || — || align=right | 4.7 km || 
|-id=741 bgcolor=#E9E9E9
| 282741 ||  || — || February 27, 2006 || Kitt Peak || Spacewatch || — || align=right | 2.3 km || 
|-id=742 bgcolor=#E9E9E9
| 282742 ||  || — || March 4, 2006 || Mount Lemmon || Mount Lemmon Survey || — || align=right | 1.8 km || 
|-id=743 bgcolor=#E9E9E9
| 282743 ||  || — || March 4, 2006 || Kitt Peak || Spacewatch || — || align=right | 2.7 km || 
|-id=744 bgcolor=#E9E9E9
| 282744 ||  || — || March 3, 2006 || Catalina || CSS || — || align=right | 3.3 km || 
|-id=745 bgcolor=#E9E9E9
| 282745 ||  || — || March 23, 2006 || Kitt Peak || Spacewatch || — || align=right | 1.9 km || 
|-id=746 bgcolor=#E9E9E9
| 282746 ||  || — || March 24, 2006 || Mount Lemmon || Mount Lemmon Survey || WIT || align=right | 1.1 km || 
|-id=747 bgcolor=#d6d6d6
| 282747 ||  || — || March 31, 2006 || Anderson Mesa || LONEOS || THB || align=right | 3.8 km || 
|-id=748 bgcolor=#E9E9E9
| 282748 ||  || — || April 2, 2006 || Schiaparelli || Schiaparelli Obs. || — || align=right | 2.2 km || 
|-id=749 bgcolor=#E9E9E9
| 282749 ||  || — || April 7, 2006 || Catalina || CSS || — || align=right | 2.6 km || 
|-id=750 bgcolor=#E9E9E9
| 282750 ||  || — || April 2, 2006 || Anderson Mesa || LONEOS || — || align=right | 2.3 km || 
|-id=751 bgcolor=#E9E9E9
| 282751 ||  || — || April 7, 2006 || Anderson Mesa || LONEOS || INO || align=right | 1.7 km || 
|-id=752 bgcolor=#E9E9E9
| 282752 ||  || — || April 2, 2006 || Anderson Mesa || LONEOS || — || align=right | 3.9 km || 
|-id=753 bgcolor=#E9E9E9
| 282753 ||  || — || April 9, 2006 || Anderson Mesa || LONEOS || — || align=right | 2.9 km || 
|-id=754 bgcolor=#E9E9E9
| 282754 ||  || — || April 19, 2006 || Kitt Peak || Spacewatch || — || align=right | 3.2 km || 
|-id=755 bgcolor=#E9E9E9
| 282755 ||  || — || April 19, 2006 || Mount Lemmon || Mount Lemmon Survey || — || align=right | 1.8 km || 
|-id=756 bgcolor=#E9E9E9
| 282756 ||  || — || April 21, 2006 || Reedy Creek || J. Broughton || JUN || align=right | 1.8 km || 
|-id=757 bgcolor=#E9E9E9
| 282757 ||  || — || April 20, 2006 || Kitt Peak || Spacewatch || — || align=right | 1.5 km || 
|-id=758 bgcolor=#E9E9E9
| 282758 ||  || — || April 20, 2006 || Mount Lemmon || Mount Lemmon Survey || — || align=right | 2.5 km || 
|-id=759 bgcolor=#E9E9E9
| 282759 ||  || — || April 18, 2006 || Kitt Peak || Spacewatch || — || align=right | 3.3 km || 
|-id=760 bgcolor=#E9E9E9
| 282760 ||  || — || April 21, 2006 || Kitt Peak || Spacewatch || — || align=right | 3.3 km || 
|-id=761 bgcolor=#E9E9E9
| 282761 ||  || — || April 26, 2006 || Kitt Peak || Spacewatch || — || align=right | 2.5 km || 
|-id=762 bgcolor=#fefefe
| 282762 ||  || — || April 26, 2006 || Kitt Peak || Spacewatch || — || align=right data-sort-value="0.79" | 790 m || 
|-id=763 bgcolor=#E9E9E9
| 282763 ||  || — || April 24, 2006 || Mount Lemmon || Mount Lemmon Survey || — || align=right | 2.8 km || 
|-id=764 bgcolor=#d6d6d6
| 282764 ||  || — || April 25, 2006 || Kitt Peak || Spacewatch || — || align=right | 3.4 km || 
|-id=765 bgcolor=#d6d6d6
| 282765 ||  || — || April 26, 2006 || Kitt Peak || Spacewatch || — || align=right | 2.9 km || 
|-id=766 bgcolor=#E9E9E9
| 282766 ||  || — || April 26, 2006 || Kitt Peak || Spacewatch || — || align=right | 1.8 km || 
|-id=767 bgcolor=#d6d6d6
| 282767 ||  || — || April 30, 2006 || Kitt Peak || Spacewatch || — || align=right | 3.3 km || 
|-id=768 bgcolor=#d6d6d6
| 282768 ||  || — || April 29, 2006 || Siding Spring || SSS || — || align=right | 4.4 km || 
|-id=769 bgcolor=#E9E9E9
| 282769 ||  || — || April 30, 2006 || Kitt Peak || Spacewatch || GEF || align=right | 1.5 km || 
|-id=770 bgcolor=#E9E9E9
| 282770 ||  || — || April 19, 2006 || Kitt Peak || Spacewatch || MRX || align=right | 1.3 km || 
|-id=771 bgcolor=#E9E9E9
| 282771 ||  || — || May 3, 2006 || Reedy Creek || J. Broughton || ADE || align=right | 3.2 km || 
|-id=772 bgcolor=#E9E9E9
| 282772 ||  || — || May 2, 2006 || Mount Lemmon || Mount Lemmon Survey || EUN || align=right | 1.5 km || 
|-id=773 bgcolor=#E9E9E9
| 282773 ||  || — || May 5, 2006 || Anderson Mesa || LONEOS || — || align=right | 1.3 km || 
|-id=774 bgcolor=#E9E9E9
| 282774 ||  || — || May 14, 2006 || Palomar || NEAT || — || align=right | 1.9 km || 
|-id=775 bgcolor=#E9E9E9
| 282775 ||  || — || May 1, 2006 || Catalina || CSS || EUN || align=right | 1.8 km || 
|-id=776 bgcolor=#E9E9E9
| 282776 ||  || — || May 11, 2006 || Palomar || NEAT || GAL || align=right | 2.8 km || 
|-id=777 bgcolor=#fefefe
| 282777 ||  || — || May 19, 2006 || Palomar || NEAT || NYS || align=right data-sort-value="0.71" | 710 m || 
|-id=778 bgcolor=#E9E9E9
| 282778 ||  || — || May 20, 2006 || Kitt Peak || Spacewatch || — || align=right | 2.4 km || 
|-id=779 bgcolor=#d6d6d6
| 282779 ||  || — || May 20, 2006 || Kitt Peak || Spacewatch || — || align=right | 5.9 km || 
|-id=780 bgcolor=#E9E9E9
| 282780 ||  || — || May 21, 2006 || Kitt Peak || Spacewatch || — || align=right | 3.6 km || 
|-id=781 bgcolor=#E9E9E9
| 282781 ||  || — || May 21, 2006 || Catalina || CSS || ADE || align=right | 3.7 km || 
|-id=782 bgcolor=#E9E9E9
| 282782 ||  || — || May 21, 2006 || Kitt Peak || Spacewatch || MAR || align=right | 1.4 km || 
|-id=783 bgcolor=#E9E9E9
| 282783 ||  || — || May 20, 2006 || Kitt Peak || Spacewatch || — || align=right | 2.5 km || 
|-id=784 bgcolor=#d6d6d6
| 282784 ||  || — || May 22, 2006 || Kitt Peak || Spacewatch || — || align=right | 4.6 km || 
|-id=785 bgcolor=#d6d6d6
| 282785 ||  || — || May 21, 2006 || Kitt Peak || Spacewatch || — || align=right | 3.5 km || 
|-id=786 bgcolor=#d6d6d6
| 282786 ||  || — || February 1, 2005 || Kitt Peak || Spacewatch || — || align=right | 5.5 km || 
|-id=787 bgcolor=#d6d6d6
| 282787 ||  || — || May 25, 2006 || Mount Lemmon || Mount Lemmon Survey || — || align=right | 3.3 km || 
|-id=788 bgcolor=#E9E9E9
| 282788 ||  || — || May 29, 2006 || Kitt Peak || Spacewatch || — || align=right | 2.3 km || 
|-id=789 bgcolor=#fefefe
| 282789 ||  || — || May 25, 2006 || Socorro || LINEAR || H || align=right | 1.0 km || 
|-id=790 bgcolor=#fefefe
| 282790 ||  || — || June 20, 2006 || Hibiscus || S. F. Hönig || — || align=right | 1.2 km || 
|-id=791 bgcolor=#d6d6d6
| 282791 || 2006 NA || — || July 1, 2006 || Eskridge || Farpoint Obs. || URS || align=right | 4.2 km || 
|-id=792 bgcolor=#d6d6d6
| 282792 ||  || — || July 21, 2006 || Catalina || CSS || — || align=right | 4.1 km || 
|-id=793 bgcolor=#d6d6d6
| 282793 ||  || — || July 25, 2006 || Palomar || NEAT || — || align=right | 2.8 km || 
|-id=794 bgcolor=#d6d6d6
| 282794 ||  || — || July 27, 2006 || Hibiscus || S. F. Hönig || — || align=right | 4.0 km || 
|-id=795 bgcolor=#FA8072
| 282795 ||  || — || August 15, 2006 || Palomar || NEAT || — || align=right | 1.4 km || 
|-id=796 bgcolor=#d6d6d6
| 282796 ||  || — || August 13, 2006 || Palomar || NEAT || — || align=right | 4.2 km || 
|-id=797 bgcolor=#fefefe
| 282797 ||  || — || August 12, 2006 || Palomar || NEAT || H || align=right data-sort-value="0.76" | 760 m || 
|-id=798 bgcolor=#d6d6d6
| 282798 ||  || — || August 20, 2006 || Palomar || NEAT || — || align=right | 4.4 km || 
|-id=799 bgcolor=#d6d6d6
| 282799 ||  || — || August 23, 2006 || Socorro || LINEAR || — || align=right | 3.7 km || 
|-id=800 bgcolor=#fefefe
| 282800 ||  || — || August 19, 2006 || Anderson Mesa || LONEOS || — || align=right | 1.0 km || 
|}

282801–282900 

|-bgcolor=#d6d6d6
| 282801 ||  || — || August 16, 2006 || Palomar || NEAT || — || align=right | 4.1 km || 
|-id=802 bgcolor=#fefefe
| 282802 ||  || — || August 16, 2006 || Palomar || NEAT || — || align=right data-sort-value="0.85" | 850 m || 
|-id=803 bgcolor=#d6d6d6
| 282803 ||  || — || August 24, 2006 || Socorro || LINEAR || — || align=right | 4.6 km || 
|-id=804 bgcolor=#d6d6d6
| 282804 ||  || — || August 27, 2006 || Anderson Mesa || LONEOS || — || align=right | 4.9 km || 
|-id=805 bgcolor=#d6d6d6
| 282805 ||  || — || August 16, 2006 || Palomar || NEAT || — || align=right | 4.4 km || 
|-id=806 bgcolor=#d6d6d6
| 282806 ||  || — || August 18, 2006 || Palomar || NEAT || EOS || align=right | 2.8 km || 
|-id=807 bgcolor=#d6d6d6
| 282807 ||  || — || August 18, 2006 || Kitt Peak || Spacewatch || — || align=right | 2.9 km || 
|-id=808 bgcolor=#d6d6d6
| 282808 ||  || — || August 19, 2006 || Kitt Peak || Spacewatch || EOS || align=right | 2.4 km || 
|-id=809 bgcolor=#d6d6d6
| 282809 ||  || — || September 14, 2006 || Catalina || CSS || URS || align=right | 6.2 km || 
|-id=810 bgcolor=#d6d6d6
| 282810 ||  || — || September 14, 2006 || Catalina || CSS || — || align=right | 5.2 km || 
|-id=811 bgcolor=#d6d6d6
| 282811 ||  || — || September 13, 2006 || Palomar || NEAT || CHA || align=right | 3.1 km || 
|-id=812 bgcolor=#d6d6d6
| 282812 ||  || — || September 14, 2006 || Catalina || CSS || — || align=right | 3.4 km || 
|-id=813 bgcolor=#d6d6d6
| 282813 ||  || — || September 15, 2006 || Socorro || LINEAR || — || align=right | 4.1 km || 
|-id=814 bgcolor=#d6d6d6
| 282814 ||  || — || September 14, 2006 || Catalina || CSS || — || align=right | 4.1 km || 
|-id=815 bgcolor=#d6d6d6
| 282815 ||  || — || September 13, 2006 || Palomar || NEAT || EOS || align=right | 2.0 km || 
|-id=816 bgcolor=#d6d6d6
| 282816 ||  || — || September 15, 2006 || Kitt Peak || Spacewatch || — || align=right | 3.2 km || 
|-id=817 bgcolor=#d6d6d6
| 282817 ||  || — || September 15, 2006 || Kitt Peak || Spacewatch || LIX || align=right | 3.3 km || 
|-id=818 bgcolor=#E9E9E9
| 282818 ||  || — || September 18, 2006 || Kitt Peak || Spacewatch || GER || align=right | 1.8 km || 
|-id=819 bgcolor=#d6d6d6
| 282819 ||  || — || September 17, 2006 || Anderson Mesa || LONEOS || — || align=right | 5.1 km || 
|-id=820 bgcolor=#d6d6d6
| 282820 ||  || — || September 16, 2006 || Catalina || CSS || EUP || align=right | 5.7 km || 
|-id=821 bgcolor=#fefefe
| 282821 ||  || — || September 22, 2006 || Anderson Mesa || LONEOS || H || align=right data-sort-value="0.83" | 830 m || 
|-id=822 bgcolor=#E9E9E9
| 282822 ||  || — || September 24, 2006 || Kitt Peak || Spacewatch || — || align=right data-sort-value="0.88" | 880 m || 
|-id=823 bgcolor=#d6d6d6
| 282823 ||  || — || September 27, 2006 || Mount Lemmon || Mount Lemmon Survey || — || align=right | 2.7 km || 
|-id=824 bgcolor=#d6d6d6
| 282824 ||  || — || September 25, 2006 || Anderson Mesa || LONEOS || — || align=right | 4.1 km || 
|-id=825 bgcolor=#d6d6d6
| 282825 ||  || — || September 26, 2006 || Kitt Peak || Spacewatch || — || align=right | 3.5 km || 
|-id=826 bgcolor=#E9E9E9
| 282826 ||  || — || September 27, 2006 || Mount Lemmon || Mount Lemmon Survey || KON || align=right | 3.2 km || 
|-id=827 bgcolor=#d6d6d6
| 282827 ||  || — || September 28, 2006 || Catalina || CSS || — || align=right | 4.2 km || 
|-id=828 bgcolor=#d6d6d6
| 282828 ||  || — || September 17, 2006 || Kitt Peak || Spacewatch || THM || align=right | 3.1 km || 
|-id=829 bgcolor=#E9E9E9
| 282829 ||  || — || October 12, 2006 || Kitt Peak || Spacewatch || KON || align=right | 2.1 km || 
|-id=830 bgcolor=#d6d6d6
| 282830 ||  || — || October 11, 2006 || Palomar || NEAT || — || align=right | 4.4 km || 
|-id=831 bgcolor=#E9E9E9
| 282831 ||  || — || October 11, 2006 || Palomar || NEAT || — || align=right | 1.00 km || 
|-id=832 bgcolor=#d6d6d6
| 282832 ||  || — || October 12, 2006 || Palomar || NEAT || — || align=right | 3.6 km || 
|-id=833 bgcolor=#d6d6d6
| 282833 ||  || — || October 3, 2006 || Siding Spring || SSS || EUP || align=right | 4.8 km || 
|-id=834 bgcolor=#d6d6d6
| 282834 ||  || — || October 16, 2006 || Catalina || CSS || MEL || align=right | 6.1 km || 
|-id=835 bgcolor=#d6d6d6
| 282835 ||  || — || October 16, 2006 || Catalina || CSS || HYG || align=right | 3.1 km || 
|-id=836 bgcolor=#E9E9E9
| 282836 ||  || — || October 16, 2006 || Kitt Peak || Spacewatch || — || align=right | 1.4 km || 
|-id=837 bgcolor=#d6d6d6
| 282837 ||  || — || October 17, 2006 || Kitt Peak || Spacewatch || — || align=right | 4.1 km || 
|-id=838 bgcolor=#d6d6d6
| 282838 ||  || — || October 17, 2006 || Kitt Peak || Spacewatch || — || align=right | 5.4 km || 
|-id=839 bgcolor=#d6d6d6
| 282839 ||  || — || October 19, 2006 || Catalina || CSS || — || align=right | 4.5 km || 
|-id=840 bgcolor=#E9E9E9
| 282840 ||  || — || October 19, 2006 || Mount Lemmon || Mount Lemmon Survey || — || align=right | 1.2 km || 
|-id=841 bgcolor=#d6d6d6
| 282841 ||  || — || October 20, 2006 || Kitt Peak || Spacewatch || EOS || align=right | 1.9 km || 
|-id=842 bgcolor=#E9E9E9
| 282842 ||  || — || October 19, 2006 || Catalina || CSS || RAF || align=right | 1.3 km || 
|-id=843 bgcolor=#d6d6d6
| 282843 ||  || — || October 19, 2006 || Catalina || CSS || EUP || align=right | 5.1 km || 
|-id=844 bgcolor=#fefefe
| 282844 ||  || — || October 22, 2006 || Palomar || NEAT || — || align=right | 3.0 km || 
|-id=845 bgcolor=#d6d6d6
| 282845 ||  || — || October 28, 2006 || Apache Point || SDSS || — || align=right | 4.0 km || 
|-id=846 bgcolor=#fefefe
| 282846 ||  || — || November 11, 2006 || Socorro || LINEAR || H || align=right | 1.4 km || 
|-id=847 bgcolor=#E9E9E9
| 282847 ||  || — || November 10, 2006 || Kitt Peak || Spacewatch || — || align=right | 1.3 km || 
|-id=848 bgcolor=#d6d6d6
| 282848 ||  || — || November 11, 2006 || Catalina || CSS || THM || align=right | 3.5 km || 
|-id=849 bgcolor=#d6d6d6
| 282849 ||  || — || November 11, 2006 || Kitt Peak || Spacewatch || — || align=right | 3.0 km || 
|-id=850 bgcolor=#d6d6d6
| 282850 ||  || — || November 19, 2006 || Socorro || LINEAR || — || align=right | 4.7 km || 
|-id=851 bgcolor=#fefefe
| 282851 ||  || — || December 8, 2006 || Anderson Mesa || LONEOS || H || align=right | 1.0 km || 
|-id=852 bgcolor=#fefefe
| 282852 ||  || — || December 12, 2006 || Mount Lemmon || Mount Lemmon Survey || V || align=right data-sort-value="0.91" | 910 m || 
|-id=853 bgcolor=#fefefe
| 282853 ||  || — || January 10, 2007 || Mount Lemmon || Mount Lemmon Survey || — || align=right data-sort-value="0.78" | 780 m || 
|-id=854 bgcolor=#fefefe
| 282854 ||  || — || January 17, 2007 || Kitt Peak || Spacewatch || — || align=right data-sort-value="0.76" | 760 m || 
|-id=855 bgcolor=#E9E9E9
| 282855 ||  || — || January 24, 2007 || Socorro || LINEAR || — || align=right | 1.2 km || 
|-id=856 bgcolor=#fefefe
| 282856 ||  || — || January 24, 2007 || Catalina || CSS || V || align=right | 1.1 km || 
|-id=857 bgcolor=#fefefe
| 282857 ||  || — || January 26, 2007 || Kitt Peak || Spacewatch || NYS || align=right data-sort-value="0.76" | 760 m || 
|-id=858 bgcolor=#E9E9E9
| 282858 ||  || — || January 26, 2007 || Kitt Peak || Spacewatch || — || align=right | 1.0 km || 
|-id=859 bgcolor=#fefefe
| 282859 ||  || — || February 7, 2007 || Palomar || NEAT || — || align=right | 1.1 km || 
|-id=860 bgcolor=#fefefe
| 282860 ||  || — || February 5, 2007 || Lulin Observatory || H.-C. Lin, Q.-z. Ye || — || align=right | 1.8 km || 
|-id=861 bgcolor=#E9E9E9
| 282861 ||  || — || February 17, 2007 || Kitt Peak || Spacewatch || — || align=right | 2.7 km || 
|-id=862 bgcolor=#fefefe
| 282862 ||  || — || February 17, 2007 || Kitt Peak || Spacewatch || — || align=right data-sort-value="0.75" | 750 m || 
|-id=863 bgcolor=#fefefe
| 282863 ||  || — || February 17, 2007 || Kitt Peak || Spacewatch || — || align=right data-sort-value="0.83" | 830 m || 
|-id=864 bgcolor=#fefefe
| 282864 ||  || — || February 16, 2007 || Catalina || CSS || FLO || align=right data-sort-value="0.85" | 850 m || 
|-id=865 bgcolor=#fefefe
| 282865 ||  || — || February 23, 2007 || Kitt Peak || Spacewatch || — || align=right data-sort-value="0.98" | 980 m || 
|-id=866 bgcolor=#d6d6d6
| 282866 ||  || — || February 27, 2007 || Kitt Peak || Spacewatch || HYG || align=right | 4.7 km || 
|-id=867 bgcolor=#E9E9E9
| 282867 ||  || — || February 19, 2007 || Catalina || CSS || — || align=right | 3.4 km || 
|-id=868 bgcolor=#E9E9E9
| 282868 ||  || — || March 9, 2007 || Kitt Peak || Spacewatch || JUN || align=right | 1.3 km || 
|-id=869 bgcolor=#fefefe
| 282869 ||  || — || March 9, 2007 || Mount Lemmon || Mount Lemmon Survey || MAS || align=right data-sort-value="0.80" | 800 m || 
|-id=870 bgcolor=#fefefe
| 282870 ||  || — || March 10, 2007 || Kitt Peak || Spacewatch || FLO || align=right data-sort-value="0.82" | 820 m || 
|-id=871 bgcolor=#fefefe
| 282871 ||  || — || March 9, 2007 || Mount Lemmon || Mount Lemmon Survey || V || align=right data-sort-value="0.62" | 620 m || 
|-id=872 bgcolor=#fefefe
| 282872 ||  || — || March 12, 2007 || Mount Lemmon || Mount Lemmon Survey || — || align=right data-sort-value="0.92" | 920 m || 
|-id=873 bgcolor=#FA8072
| 282873 ||  || — || March 10, 2007 || Kitt Peak || Spacewatch || — || align=right | 1.0 km || 
|-id=874 bgcolor=#fefefe
| 282874 ||  || — || March 10, 2007 || Kitt Peak || Spacewatch || — || align=right | 1.0 km || 
|-id=875 bgcolor=#fefefe
| 282875 ||  || — || March 9, 2007 || Catalina || CSS || — || align=right | 1.6 km || 
|-id=876 bgcolor=#fefefe
| 282876 ||  || — || March 11, 2007 || Kitt Peak || Spacewatch || — || align=right | 1.1 km || 
|-id=877 bgcolor=#E9E9E9
| 282877 ||  || — || February 26, 2007 || Mount Lemmon || Mount Lemmon Survey || NEM || align=right | 2.2 km || 
|-id=878 bgcolor=#fefefe
| 282878 ||  || — || March 11, 2007 || Kitt Peak || Spacewatch || NYS || align=right data-sort-value="0.79" | 790 m || 
|-id=879 bgcolor=#fefefe
| 282879 ||  || — || March 9, 2007 || Mount Lemmon || Mount Lemmon Survey || NYS || align=right data-sort-value="0.64" | 640 m || 
|-id=880 bgcolor=#fefefe
| 282880 ||  || — || March 12, 2007 || Kitt Peak || Spacewatch || — || align=right data-sort-value="0.98" | 980 m || 
|-id=881 bgcolor=#fefefe
| 282881 ||  || — || March 14, 2007 || Mount Lemmon || Mount Lemmon Survey || — || align=right data-sort-value="0.99" | 990 m || 
|-id=882 bgcolor=#fefefe
| 282882 ||  || — || March 14, 2007 || Mount Lemmon || Mount Lemmon Survey || — || align=right data-sort-value="0.63" | 630 m || 
|-id=883 bgcolor=#fefefe
| 282883 ||  || — || March 14, 2007 || Catalina || CSS || — || align=right | 1.0 km || 
|-id=884 bgcolor=#fefefe
| 282884 ||  || — || March 11, 2007 || Mount Lemmon || Mount Lemmon Survey || NYS || align=right data-sort-value="0.88" | 880 m || 
|-id=885 bgcolor=#fefefe
| 282885 ||  || — || March 13, 2007 || Kitt Peak || Spacewatch || V || align=right data-sort-value="0.60" | 600 m || 
|-id=886 bgcolor=#fefefe
| 282886 ||  || — || March 14, 2007 || Kitt Peak || Spacewatch || — || align=right data-sort-value="0.99" | 990 m || 
|-id=887 bgcolor=#fefefe
| 282887 ||  || — || March 13, 2007 || Kitt Peak || Spacewatch || — || align=right data-sort-value="0.88" | 880 m || 
|-id=888 bgcolor=#fefefe
| 282888 ||  || — || March 8, 2007 || Palomar || NEAT || FLO || align=right data-sort-value="0.67" | 670 m || 
|-id=889 bgcolor=#fefefe
| 282889 ||  || — || March 20, 2007 || Kitt Peak || Spacewatch || MAS || align=right data-sort-value="0.80" | 800 m || 
|-id=890 bgcolor=#fefefe
| 282890 ||  || — || March 20, 2007 || Mount Lemmon || Mount Lemmon Survey || V || align=right data-sort-value="0.73" | 730 m || 
|-id=891 bgcolor=#fefefe
| 282891 ||  || — || April 7, 2007 || Mount Lemmon || Mount Lemmon Survey || FLO || align=right data-sort-value="0.68" | 680 m || 
|-id=892 bgcolor=#fefefe
| 282892 ||  || — || April 11, 2007 || Kitt Peak || Spacewatch || — || align=right data-sort-value="0.85" | 850 m || 
|-id=893 bgcolor=#E9E9E9
| 282893 ||  || — || April 11, 2007 || Kitt Peak || Spacewatch || — || align=right | 1.5 km || 
|-id=894 bgcolor=#fefefe
| 282894 ||  || — || April 11, 2007 || Mount Lemmon || Mount Lemmon Survey || NYS || align=right data-sort-value="0.81" | 810 m || 
|-id=895 bgcolor=#E9E9E9
| 282895 ||  || — || April 12, 2007 || Črni Vrh || Črni Vrh || — || align=right | 3.4 km || 
|-id=896 bgcolor=#fefefe
| 282896 ||  || — || April 14, 2007 || Kitt Peak || Spacewatch || — || align=right data-sort-value="0.94" | 940 m || 
|-id=897 bgcolor=#fefefe
| 282897 Kaltenbrunner ||  ||  || April 15, 2007 || Altschwendt || W. Ries || — || align=right data-sort-value="0.93" | 930 m || 
|-id=898 bgcolor=#fefefe
| 282898 ||  || — || April 14, 2007 || Mount Lemmon || Mount Lemmon Survey || V || align=right data-sort-value="0.91" | 910 m || 
|-id=899 bgcolor=#E9E9E9
| 282899 ||  || — || April 14, 2007 || Kitt Peak || Spacewatch || — || align=right | 1.8 km || 
|-id=900 bgcolor=#E9E9E9
| 282900 ||  || — || April 15, 2007 || Socorro || LINEAR || — || align=right | 3.7 km || 
|}

282901–283000 

|-bgcolor=#E9E9E9
| 282901 ||  || — || April 15, 2007 || Catalina || CSS || — || align=right | 2.9 km || 
|-id=902 bgcolor=#fefefe
| 282902 ||  || — || April 18, 2007 || Mount Lemmon || Mount Lemmon Survey || MAS || align=right data-sort-value="0.86" | 860 m || 
|-id=903 bgcolor=#fefefe
| 282903 Masada ||  ||  || April 20, 2007 || Vallemare di Borbona || V. S. Casulli || V || align=right data-sort-value="0.77" | 770 m || 
|-id=904 bgcolor=#fefefe
| 282904 ||  || — || April 18, 2007 || Kitt Peak || Spacewatch || — || align=right | 1.0 km || 
|-id=905 bgcolor=#fefefe
| 282905 ||  || — || April 20, 2007 || Kitt Peak || Spacewatch || — || align=right | 1.1 km || 
|-id=906 bgcolor=#fefefe
| 282906 ||  || — || April 22, 2007 || Kitt Peak || Spacewatch || — || align=right | 1.2 km || 
|-id=907 bgcolor=#fefefe
| 282907 ||  || — || April 22, 2007 || Catalina || CSS || — || align=right | 1.2 km || 
|-id=908 bgcolor=#fefefe
| 282908 ||  || — || April 25, 2007 || Mount Lemmon || Mount Lemmon Survey || V || align=right data-sort-value="0.87" | 870 m || 
|-id=909 bgcolor=#fefefe
| 282909 ||  || — || April 22, 2007 || Catalina || CSS || — || align=right | 1.1 km || 
|-id=910 bgcolor=#fefefe
| 282910 ||  || — || April 25, 2007 || Kitt Peak || Spacewatch || V || align=right | 1.0 km || 
|-id=911 bgcolor=#E9E9E9
| 282911 ||  || — || April 16, 2007 || Catalina || CSS || MRX || align=right | 1.5 km || 
|-id=912 bgcolor=#fefefe
| 282912 ||  || — || May 6, 2007 || Kitt Peak || Spacewatch || V || align=right data-sort-value="0.83" | 830 m || 
|-id=913 bgcolor=#E9E9E9
| 282913 ||  || — || May 13, 2007 || Siding Spring || SSS || — || align=right | 3.4 km || 
|-id=914 bgcolor=#fefefe
| 282914 ||  || — || June 10, 2007 || Kitt Peak || Spacewatch || NYS || align=right data-sort-value="0.91" | 910 m || 
|-id=915 bgcolor=#E9E9E9
| 282915 ||  || — || June 11, 2007 || Siding Spring || SSS || — || align=right | 2.3 km || 
|-id=916 bgcolor=#fefefe
| 282916 ||  || — || June 14, 2007 || Kitt Peak || Spacewatch || NYS || align=right data-sort-value="0.76" | 760 m || 
|-id=917 bgcolor=#FA8072
| 282917 ||  || — || June 15, 2007 || Catalina || CSS || — || align=right | 1.4 km || 
|-id=918 bgcolor=#E9E9E9
| 282918 ||  || — || July 14, 2007 || Tiki || S. F. Hönig, N. Teamo || ADE || align=right | 3.7 km || 
|-id=919 bgcolor=#E9E9E9
| 282919 ||  || — || July 15, 2007 || Siding Spring || SSS || — || align=right | 2.6 km || 
|-id=920 bgcolor=#fefefe
| 282920 ||  || — || July 22, 2007 || Lulin Observatory || LUSS || V || align=right | 1.1 km || 
|-id=921 bgcolor=#E9E9E9
| 282921 ||  || — || July 22, 2007 || Lulin || LUSS || — || align=right | 1.5 km || 
|-id=922 bgcolor=#E9E9E9
| 282922 ||  || — || August 6, 2007 || Lulin || LUSS || — || align=right | 3.0 km || 
|-id=923 bgcolor=#E9E9E9
| 282923 ||  || — || August 6, 2007 || Lulin || LUSS || — || align=right | 3.0 km || 
|-id=924 bgcolor=#fefefe
| 282924 ||  || — || August 11, 2007 || Socorro || LINEAR || — || align=right | 1.2 km || 
|-id=925 bgcolor=#E9E9E9
| 282925 ||  || — || August 8, 2007 || Socorro || LINEAR || — || align=right | 2.4 km || 
|-id=926 bgcolor=#fefefe
| 282926 ||  || — || August 9, 2007 || Socorro || LINEAR || V || align=right data-sort-value="0.95" | 950 m || 
|-id=927 bgcolor=#fefefe
| 282927 ||  || — || August 12, 2007 || Socorro || LINEAR || — || align=right | 1.4 km || 
|-id=928 bgcolor=#E9E9E9
| 282928 ||  || — || August 12, 2007 || Socorro || LINEAR || INO || align=right | 2.2 km || 
|-id=929 bgcolor=#E9E9E9
| 282929 ||  || — || August 6, 2007 || Socorro || LINEAR || JUN || align=right | 1.8 km || 
|-id=930 bgcolor=#E9E9E9
| 282930 ||  || — || August 11, 2007 || Socorro || LINEAR || GEF || align=right | 1.8 km || 
|-id=931 bgcolor=#fefefe
| 282931 ||  || — || August 5, 2007 || Socorro || LINEAR || — || align=right | 1.5 km || 
|-id=932 bgcolor=#E9E9E9
| 282932 ||  || — || August 9, 2007 || Socorro || LINEAR || — || align=right | 2.1 km || 
|-id=933 bgcolor=#E9E9E9
| 282933 ||  || — || August 6, 2007 || Črni Vrh || Črni Vrh || — || align=right | 4.1 km || 
|-id=934 bgcolor=#E9E9E9
| 282934 ||  || — || August 12, 2007 || Siding Spring || SSS || BAR || align=right | 1.9 km || 
|-id=935 bgcolor=#E9E9E9
| 282935 ||  || — || August 9, 2007 || Socorro || LINEAR || — || align=right | 1.2 km || 
|-id=936 bgcolor=#d6d6d6
| 282936 ||  || — || August 22, 2007 || Socorro || LINEAR || TEL || align=right | 2.2 km || 
|-id=937 bgcolor=#d6d6d6
| 282937 ||  || — || August 23, 2007 || Kitt Peak || Spacewatch || — || align=right | 4.4 km || 
|-id=938 bgcolor=#E9E9E9
| 282938 ||  || — || September 10, 2007 || Dauban || Chante-Perdrix Obs. || — || align=right | 2.7 km || 
|-id=939 bgcolor=#E9E9E9
| 282939 ||  || — || September 3, 2007 || Catalina || CSS || EUN || align=right | 1.5 km || 
|-id=940 bgcolor=#d6d6d6
| 282940 ||  || — || September 12, 2007 || Dauban || Chante-Perdrix Obs. || — || align=right | 3.1 km || 
|-id=941 bgcolor=#E9E9E9
| 282941 ||  || — || September 4, 2007 || Mount Lemmon || Mount Lemmon Survey || HNS || align=right | 2.2 km || 
|-id=942 bgcolor=#d6d6d6
| 282942 ||  || — || September 8, 2007 || Anderson Mesa || LONEOS || HYG || align=right | 5.2 km || 
|-id=943 bgcolor=#E9E9E9
| 282943 ||  || — || September 9, 2007 || Kitt Peak || Spacewatch || — || align=right | 1.5 km || 
|-id=944 bgcolor=#E9E9E9
| 282944 ||  || — || September 9, 2007 || Kitt Peak || Spacewatch || — || align=right | 3.1 km || 
|-id=945 bgcolor=#E9E9E9
| 282945 ||  || — || September 9, 2007 || Kitt Peak || Spacewatch || RAF || align=right | 1.2 km || 
|-id=946 bgcolor=#d6d6d6
| 282946 ||  || — || September 10, 2007 || Mount Lemmon || Mount Lemmon Survey || THM || align=right | 2.6 km || 
|-id=947 bgcolor=#E9E9E9
| 282947 ||  || — || September 11, 2007 || Kitt Peak || Spacewatch || — || align=right | 2.5 km || 
|-id=948 bgcolor=#E9E9E9
| 282948 ||  || — || September 11, 2007 || Catalina || CSS || DOR || align=right | 3.9 km || 
|-id=949 bgcolor=#d6d6d6
| 282949 ||  || — || September 11, 2007 || Kitt Peak || Spacewatch || EOS || align=right | 2.6 km || 
|-id=950 bgcolor=#E9E9E9
| 282950 ||  || — || September 12, 2007 || Catalina || CSS || — || align=right | 2.9 km || 
|-id=951 bgcolor=#E9E9E9
| 282951 ||  || — || September 14, 2007 || Socorro || LINEAR || — || align=right | 2.3 km || 
|-id=952 bgcolor=#E9E9E9
| 282952 ||  || — || September 13, 2007 || La Sagra || OAM Obs. || — || align=right | 2.3 km || 
|-id=953 bgcolor=#E9E9E9
| 282953 ||  || — || September 13, 2007 || Kitt Peak || Spacewatch || — || align=right | 2.0 km || 
|-id=954 bgcolor=#E9E9E9
| 282954 ||  || — || September 13, 2007 || Kitt Peak || Spacewatch || — || align=right | 2.7 km || 
|-id=955 bgcolor=#d6d6d6
| 282955 ||  || — || September 14, 2007 || Mount Lemmon || Mount Lemmon Survey || — || align=right | 3.3 km || 
|-id=956 bgcolor=#E9E9E9
| 282956 ||  || — || September 13, 2007 || Catalina || CSS || MAR || align=right | 1.6 km || 
|-id=957 bgcolor=#d6d6d6
| 282957 ||  || — || September 10, 2007 || Catalina || CSS || — || align=right | 4.3 km || 
|-id=958 bgcolor=#E9E9E9
| 282958 ||  || — || September 14, 2007 || Kitt Peak || Spacewatch || — || align=right | 1.4 km || 
|-id=959 bgcolor=#E9E9E9
| 282959 ||  || — || September 14, 2007 || Kitt Peak || Spacewatch || — || align=right | 1.7 km || 
|-id=960 bgcolor=#d6d6d6
| 282960 ||  || — || September 14, 2007 || Kitt Peak || Spacewatch || EOS || align=right | 2.5 km || 
|-id=961 bgcolor=#fefefe
| 282961 ||  || — || September 15, 2007 || Anderson Mesa || LONEOS || NYS || align=right data-sort-value="0.95" | 950 m || 
|-id=962 bgcolor=#E9E9E9
| 282962 ||  || — || September 15, 2007 || Kitt Peak || Spacewatch || WIT || align=right | 1.1 km || 
|-id=963 bgcolor=#E9E9E9
| 282963 ||  || — || September 5, 2007 || Catalina || CSS || — || align=right | 3.1 km || 
|-id=964 bgcolor=#E9E9E9
| 282964 ||  || — || September 14, 2007 || Anderson Mesa || LONEOS || HNS || align=right | 2.2 km || 
|-id=965 bgcolor=#E9E9E9
| 282965 ||  || — || September 5, 2007 || Catalina || CSS || — || align=right | 1.9 km || 
|-id=966 bgcolor=#E9E9E9
| 282966 ||  || — || September 3, 2007 || Catalina || CSS || — || align=right | 3.5 km || 
|-id=967 bgcolor=#E9E9E9
| 282967 ||  || — || July 18, 2007 || Mount Lemmon || Mount Lemmon Survey || — || align=right | 2.9 km || 
|-id=968 bgcolor=#E9E9E9
| 282968 ||  || — || September 18, 2007 || Hibiscus || S. F. Hönig, N. Teamo || — || align=right | 2.9 km || 
|-id=969 bgcolor=#d6d6d6
| 282969 ||  || — || September 20, 2007 || Farra d'Isonzo || Farra d'Isonzo || TIR || align=right | 4.0 km || 
|-id=970 bgcolor=#d6d6d6
| 282970 ||  || — || September 18, 2007 || Kitt Peak || Spacewatch || — || align=right | 4.4 km || 
|-id=971 bgcolor=#E9E9E9
| 282971 ||  || — || September 22, 2007 || Socorro || LINEAR || — || align=right | 1.7 km || 
|-id=972 bgcolor=#E9E9E9
| 282972 ||  || — || October 6, 2007 || La Sagra || OAM Obs. || — || align=right | 3.3 km || 
|-id=973 bgcolor=#E9E9E9
| 282973 ||  || — || October 6, 2007 || Socorro || LINEAR || — || align=right | 1.6 km || 
|-id=974 bgcolor=#E9E9E9
| 282974 ||  || — || October 7, 2007 || La Sagra || OAM Obs. || — || align=right | 3.0 km || 
|-id=975 bgcolor=#d6d6d6
| 282975 ||  || — || October 8, 2007 || La Sagra || OAM Obs. || — || align=right | 4.8 km || 
|-id=976 bgcolor=#E9E9E9
| 282976 ||  || — || October 4, 2007 || Kitt Peak || Spacewatch || — || align=right | 2.9 km || 
|-id=977 bgcolor=#d6d6d6
| 282977 ||  || — || October 6, 2007 || Kitt Peak || Spacewatch || — || align=right | 3.5 km || 
|-id=978 bgcolor=#E9E9E9
| 282978 ||  || — || October 6, 2007 || Kitt Peak || Spacewatch || — || align=right | 2.5 km || 
|-id=979 bgcolor=#E9E9E9
| 282979 ||  || — || October 6, 2007 || Purple Mountain || PMO NEO || RAF || align=right | 1.3 km || 
|-id=980 bgcolor=#d6d6d6
| 282980 ||  || — || October 4, 2007 || Kitt Peak || Spacewatch || KOR || align=right | 1.7 km || 
|-id=981 bgcolor=#d6d6d6
| 282981 ||  || — || October 9, 2007 || Tiki || N. Teamo, J.-C. Pelle || — || align=right | 3.6 km || 
|-id=982 bgcolor=#d6d6d6
| 282982 ||  || — || October 7, 2007 || Catalina || CSS || — || align=right | 3.1 km || 
|-id=983 bgcolor=#E9E9E9
| 282983 ||  || — || October 7, 2007 || Catalina || CSS || EUN || align=right | 1.8 km || 
|-id=984 bgcolor=#E9E9E9
| 282984 ||  || — || October 7, 2007 || Catalina || CSS || MRX || align=right | 1.3 km || 
|-id=985 bgcolor=#d6d6d6
| 282985 ||  || — || October 6, 2007 || Kitt Peak || Spacewatch || — || align=right | 3.6 km || 
|-id=986 bgcolor=#E9E9E9
| 282986 ||  || — || October 8, 2007 || Catalina || CSS || — || align=right | 4.0 km || 
|-id=987 bgcolor=#E9E9E9
| 282987 ||  || — || October 9, 2007 || Socorro || LINEAR || — || align=right | 1.3 km || 
|-id=988 bgcolor=#d6d6d6
| 282988 ||  || — || October 9, 2007 || Socorro || LINEAR || — || align=right | 4.3 km || 
|-id=989 bgcolor=#E9E9E9
| 282989 ||  || — || October 13, 2007 || Skylive Obs. || F. Tozzi || — || align=right | 1.7 km || 
|-id=990 bgcolor=#d6d6d6
| 282990 ||  || — || October 9, 2007 || Kitt Peak || Spacewatch || — || align=right | 3.3 km || 
|-id=991 bgcolor=#E9E9E9
| 282991 ||  || — || October 8, 2007 || Catalina || CSS || EUN || align=right | 1.9 km || 
|-id=992 bgcolor=#E9E9E9
| 282992 ||  || — || October 9, 2007 || Anderson Mesa || LONEOS || — || align=right | 2.8 km || 
|-id=993 bgcolor=#E9E9E9
| 282993 ||  || — || October 9, 2007 || Catalina || CSS || — || align=right | 2.2 km || 
|-id=994 bgcolor=#E9E9E9
| 282994 ||  || — || October 10, 2007 || Anderson Mesa || LONEOS || — || align=right | 2.5 km || 
|-id=995 bgcolor=#d6d6d6
| 282995 ||  || — || October 8, 2007 || Mount Lemmon || Mount Lemmon Survey || KOR || align=right | 1.7 km || 
|-id=996 bgcolor=#E9E9E9
| 282996 ||  || — || October 8, 2007 || Mount Lemmon || Mount Lemmon Survey || — || align=right | 2.5 km || 
|-id=997 bgcolor=#d6d6d6
| 282997 ||  || — || October 12, 2007 || Kitt Peak || Spacewatch || — || align=right | 3.2 km || 
|-id=998 bgcolor=#d6d6d6
| 282998 ||  || — || October 12, 2007 || Anderson Mesa || LONEOS || — || align=right | 5.1 km || 
|-id=999 bgcolor=#d6d6d6
| 282999 ||  || — || October 14, 2007 || Kitt Peak || Spacewatch || THM || align=right | 2.9 km || 
|-id=000 bgcolor=#d6d6d6
| 283000 ||  || — || October 15, 2007 || Catalina || CSS || — || align=right | 4.3 km || 
|}

References

External links 
 Discovery Circumstances: Numbered Minor Planets (280001)–(285000) (IAU Minor Planet Center)

0282